= Index of physics articles (P) =

The index of physics articles is split into multiple pages due to its size.

To navigate by individual letter use the table of contents below.

== P ==
- P-adic quantum mechanicsfpa
- P-factor
- P-form electrodynamics
- P-nuclei
- P-process
- P-type semiconductor
- P-wave
- P-wave modulus
- P. Buford Price
- P3M
- PACER (fusion)
- PANDA experiment
- PAR thrust
- PEPS effect
- PETRA
- PGM-19 Jupiter
- PHENIX
- PHOBOS experiment
- PHOSFOS
- PICASSO
- PIND
- PITZ
- PLATYPUS
- PLUTO reactor
- PM3 (chemistry)
- POLYGON experiment
- POVM
- PQS (chemical)
- PS210 experiment
- PSR B1828-10
- PSR B1913+16
- PSR J0737-3039
- PSR J1614–2230
- PUREX
- PVLAS
- PVT (physics)
- PWscf
- PYTHIA
- Padma Kant Shukla
- Padre Bancalari
- Painlevé paradox
- Pair-instability supernova
- Pair annihilation
- Pair distribution function
- Pair potential
- Pair production
- Pake doublet
- Pakistan Institute of Nuclear Science and Technology
- Pakistan Physics Society
- Panayotis Varotsos
- Pandemonium effect
- Panemone windmill
- Panofsky Prize
- Pantur Silaban
- Paolo Casati
- Papaloizou–Pringle instability
- Papapetrou–Dixon equations
- Papkovich–Neuber solution
- Parabolic trajectory
- Parabolic trough
- Parachor
- Paracrystalline
- Paraelectricity
- Parafoil
- Paraformer
- Parallax barrier
- Parallel Worlds (book)
- Parallel axis theorem
- Parallelogram of force
- Paramagnetism
- Parameterized post-Newtonian formalism
- Parametric array
- Parametric oscillator
- Parametric resonance
- Parasitic drag
- Parastatistics
- Parawing
- Paraxial approximation
- Parfocal lens
- Parhelic circle
- Paris' law
- Pariser–Parr–Pople method
- Parity (physics)
- Parity anomaly
- Parker Variable Wing
- Parker spiral
- Parney Albright
- Parry arc
- Parry–Daniels map
- Parson magneton
- Partial pressure
- Partial wave analysis
- Particle
- Particle-in-cell
- Particle-induced X-ray emission
- Particle-size analysis
- Particle-size distribution
- Particle (disambiguation)
- Particle Data Group
- Particle acceleration
- Particle accelerator
- Particle aggregation
- Particle astrophysics
- Particle beam
- Particle counter
- Particle decay
- Particle detector
- Particle displacement
- Particle experiments at Kolar Gold Fields
- Particle horizon
- Particle identification
- Particle image velocimetry
- Particle in a box
- Particle in a one-dimensional lattice
- Particle in a ring
- Particle in a spherically symmetric potential
- Particle number
- Particle number operator
- Particle physics
- Particle physics and representation theory
- Particle physics in cosmology
- Particle radiation
- Particle segregation
- Particle shower
- Particle size
- Particle size (general)
- Particle statistics
- Particle tracking velocimetry
- Particle velocity
- Particle velocity level
- Particle zoo
- Particulates
- Partition function (quantum field theory)
- Partition function (statistical mechanics)
- Parton (particle physics)
- Parton distribution function
- Parvez Butt
- Parviz Moin
- Pascal's barrel
- Pascal's law
- Pascal (unit)
- Paschen's law
- Paschen series
- Paschen–Back effect
- Pascual Jordan
- Pasotron
- Passive Underwater Fire Control Feasibility System
- Passive radiator
- Patch dynamics (physics)
- Path-ordering
- Path integral Monte Carlo
- Path integral formulation
- Path integral molecular dynamics
- Pati–Salam model
- Patricia Lewis (physicist)
- Patrick Blackett, Baron Blackett
- Patrick N. Keating
- Patrick Tabeling
- Patrick d'Arcy
- Patterson function
- Paul-Quentin Desains
- Paul A. Fleury
- Paul Alfred Biefeld
- Paul Auguste Ernest Laugier
- Paul Callaghan
- Paul Chaikin
- Paul Chun (professor)
- Paul Corkum
- Paul Davies
- Paul Dirac
- Paul Drude
- Paul E. Klopsteg
- Paul Ehrenfest
- Paul Erman
- Paul Fillunger
- Paul Flory
- Paul Frampton
- Paul G. Hewitt
- Paul G. Richards
- Paul Garabedian
- Paul Gerber
- Paul Ginsparg
- Paul Halpern
- Paul Harteck
- Paul Horowitz
- Paul John Ellis
- Paul Kunz
- Paul Langevin
- Paul Lauterbur
- Paul M. Doty
- Paul Mackenzie
- Paul McEuen
- Paul Moskowitz
- Paul Neményi
- Paul O. Müller
- Paul Painlevé
- Paul Palmer (physicist)
- Paul Peter Ewald
- Paul Richard Heinrich Blasius
- Paul Rudolph (physicist)
- Paul Scherrer
- Paul Scherrer Institute
- Paul Sophus Epstein
- Paul Steinhardt
- Paul Taunton Matthews
- Paul Townsend
- Paul Ulrich Villard
- Paul Weiss (nanoscientist)
- Pauli equation
- Pauli exclusion principle
- Pauli group
- Pauli matrices
- Pauline Morrow Austin
- Pauli–Villars regularization
- Pavel Cherenkov
- Pavel Jelínek
- Pavel Petrovich Parenago
- Pavle Savić
- Pawsey Medal
- Payload for Antimatter Matter Exploration and Light-nuclei Astrophysics
- Peak expiratory flow
- Peak kilovoltage
- Peak signal-to-noise ratio
- Peakon
- Pearl vortex
- Peccei–Quinn theory
- Peculiar motion
- Peculiar velocity
- Peder Oluf Pedersen
- Pedro Paulet
- Peierls bracket
- Peixoto's theorem
- Pelindaba
- Pelletron
- Pencil (optics)
- Pendulum
- Pendulum day
- Pendulum rocket fallacy
- Peng Huanwu
- Penguin diagram
- Penning mixture
- Penning trap
- Penrose criterion
- Penrose diagram
- Penrose graphical notation
- Penrose interpretation
- Penrose process
- Penrose transform
- Penrose–Hawking singularity theorems
- Pentamirror
- Pentaprism
- Pentaquark
- Per-Olov Löwdin
- Per Arne Rikvold
- Per Bak
- Per Carlqvist
- Percentage of the speed of light
- Percolation
- Percolation critical exponents
- Percolation theory
- Percolation threshold
- Percus–Yevick approximation
- Percy Williams Bridgman
- Peregrine soliton
- Perfect Cosmological Principle
- Perfect conductor
- Perfect fluid
- Perfect gas
- Perfect lens
- Perfect mirror
- Perfectly Reasonable Deviations from the Beaten Track
- Perhapsatron
- Perifocal coordinate system
- Perigean spring tide
- Perimeter Institute for Theoretical Physics
- Period-doubling bifurcation
- Period 9 element
- Periodic poling
- Periodic table
- Periodicity (metamaterials)
- Periodogram
- Perley Ason Ross
- Perley G. Nutting
- Perlin noise
- Permeability (electromagnetism)
- Permeability constant
- Permeameter
- Permeance
- Permeation
- Permittivity
- Perovskite (structure)
- Perpendicular axis theorem
- Perpetual motion
- Perpetual motion machine
- Perrin friction factors
- Persis Drell
- Persistence length
- Person-rem/year
- Perturbation theory
- Perturbation theory (quantum mechanics)
- Perturbative QCD
- Perveance
- Pervez Hoodbhoy
- Peskin–Takeuchi parameter
- Peter A. Sturrock
- Peter A. Wolff
- Peter Armbruster
- Peter B. Lyons
- Peter Barham
- Peter Bergmann
- Peter C. Aichelburg
- Peter Coles
- Peter Collinson (botanist)
- Peter Coveney
- Peter D. Jarvis
- Peter Debye
- Peter Demos
- Peter Dollond
- Peter Edwards (chemist)
- Peter Fowler (physicist)
- Peter Franken
- Peter Freund
- Peter Galison
- Peter Goddard (physicist)
- Peter Goldreich
- Peter Grünberg
- Peter Guthrie Tait
- Peter Haynes (mathematician)
- Peter Herbert Jensen
- Peter Heszler
- Peter Higgs
- Peter Hirsch (metallurgist)
- Peter Huybers
- Peter Hänggi
- Peter Knight (scientist)
- Peter Kramer (physicist)
- Peter Lax
- Peter Littlewood
- Peter Lu
- Peter Mansfield
- Peter Mazur
- Peter Pershan
- Peter Smith (physicist)
- Peter Stilbs
- Peter Thejll
- Peter V. E. McClintock
- Peter Wadhams
- Peter Westervelt
- Peter Woit
- Peter Zimmerman
- Peter Zoller
- Peter van Nieuwenhuizen
- Petr Beckmann
- Petr Hořava (theorist)
- Petr Paucek
- Petr Vaníček
- Petrophysics
- Petrov classification
- Petrus Peregrinus de Maricourt
- Petzval field curvature
- Pfeiffer Effect
- Pfund series
- Phantom energy
- Phase-coherent holography
- Phase-contrast imaging
- Phase (matter)
- Phase (waves)
- Phase Noise
- Phase compensation
- Phase contrast microscope
- Phase contrast microscopy
- Phase distortion
- Phase factor
- Phase noise
- Phase offset modulation
- Phase plane
- Phase portrait
- Phase problem
- Phase retrieval
- Phase space
- Phase space formulation
- Phase switch
- Phase transition
- Phase velocities
- Phase velocity
- Phased-array optics
- Phased array
- Phased array ultrasonics
- Phenomenology (particle physics)
- Phi meson
- Phil Williams (Welsh politician)
- Philip Abelson
- Philip Beckley
- Philip Burton Moon
- Philip Dee
- Philip J. Dolan
- Philip J. Morrison
- Philip L. Roe
- Philip M. Morse
- Philip Morrison
- Philip Russell (physicist)
- Philip Saffman
- Philip Warren Anderson
- Philipp Carl
- Philipp Lenard
- Philipp von Jolly
- Philippe Guyot-Sionnest
- Philippe Nozières
- Philippine Nuclear Research Institute
- Philo of Byzantium
- Philolaus
- Philosophical Magazine
- Philosophical Transactions of the Royal Society A
- Philosophical interpretation of classical physics
- Philosophiæ Naturalis Principia Mathematica
- Philosophy of physics
- Philosophy of space and time
- Philosophy of thermal and statistical physics
- Phobos (experiment)
- Phon
- Phonomotor
- Phonon
- Phonon drag
- Phonon noise
- Phononic crystal
- Phosphor
- Phosphor thermometry
- Phosphorescence
- Phosphoroscope
- Phoswich detector
- Phot
- Phot. Nano. Fund. Appl.
- Phot Nano Fund Appl
- Photo-Carnot engine
- Photo-Dember
- Photobleaching
- Photochromic lens
- Photoconduction
- Photoconductive atomic force microscopy
- Photoconductivity
- Photodetector
- Photodisintegration
- Photodissociation
- Photoelastic modulator
- Photoelasticity
- Photoelectric effect
- Photoelectric efficiency
- Photoelectric sensor
- Photoelectrochemical processes
- Photoemission spectroscopy
- Photoexcitation
- Photofission
- Photographic lens design
- Photographic magnitude
- Photographic plate
- Photoinduced charge separation
- Photoinduced phase transitions
- Photoionisation
- Photoionisation cross section
- Photolithography
- Photoluminescence
- Photomagnetic effect
- Photomagnetism
- Photomagneton
- Photometer
- Photometric redshift
- Photometry (optics)
- Photomixing
- Photomultiplier
- Photon
- Photon-in-photon-out
- Photon-intermediate direct energy conversion
- Photon Doppler velocimetry
- Photon Factory
- Photon diffusion
- Photon entanglement
- Photon epoch
- Photon gas
- Photon induced electric field poling
- Photon noise
- Photon polarization
- Photon sphere
- Photonic-crystal fiber
- Photonic crystal
- Photonic integrated circuit
- Photonic metamaterial
- Photonics
- Photonics Letters of Poland
- Photonics Society of Poland
- Photonics and Nanostructures
- Photonics and Nanostructures: Fundamentals and Applications
- Photophoresis
- Photorefractive effect
- Photoresist
- Photosensitive glass
- Photosensitizer
- Photothermal effect
- Photothermal optical microscopy
- Photothermal spectroscopy
- Photovoltaic effect
- Photovoltaics
- Phugoid
- Phun
- Phyllis S. Freier
- Phys.Org
- Physica (journal)
- Physica A
- Physica B
- Physica C
- Physica D
- Physica E
- Physica Scripta
- Physica Status Solidi
- Physica Status Solidi A
- Physica Status Solidi B
- Physica Status Solidi C
- Physica Status Solidi RRL
- Physical Biology
- Physical Chemistry Chemical Physics
- Physical Review
- Physical Review A
- Physical Review A: General Physics
- Physical Review E
- Physical Review Focus
- Physical Review Letters
- Physical Science Study Committee
- Physical Society of Japan
- Physical Society of London
- Physical acoustics
- Physical body
- Physical constant
- Physical cosmology
- Physical geodesy
- Physical law
- Physical objects
- Physical optics
- Physical paradox
- Physical phenomenon
- Physical property
- Physical quantity
- Physical Review E: Statistical Physics, Plasmas, Fluids, and Related Interdisciplinary Topics
- Physical strength
- Physical substance
- Physical system
- Physical theories modified by general relativity
- Physicist
- Physicist and Christian
- Physics
- PhysicsWeb
- Physics (American Physical Society journal)
- Physics Abstracts
- Physics Abstracts. Science Abstracts. Series A
- Physics Abstracts - Series A
- Physics Abstracts - Series A: Science Abstracts
- Physics Abstracts Series A
- Physics Analysis Workstation
- Physics Education
- Physics Letters
- Physics Letters A
- Physics Letters B
- Physics Reports
- Physics Today
- Physics and Astronomy Classification Scheme
- Physics and Chemistry of Liquids
- Physics and Chemistry of Minerals
- Physics and Star Trek
- Physics and engineering explorations
- Physics beyond the Standard Model
- Physics education
- Physics envy
- Physics equations
- Physics in Medicine and Biology
- Physics in medieval Islam
- Physics of Fluids
- Physics of Life Reviews
- Physics of Plasmas
- Physics of computation
- Physics of firearms
- Physics of glass
- Physics of skiing
- Physics of the Impossible
- Physics of the Solid State
- Physics Today
- Physikalisch-Technische Bundesanstalt
- Physikalische Blätter
- Physikalische Zeitschrift
- Pi Josephson junction
- Piara Singh Gill
- Picard horn
- Picarin
- Picotechnology
- Picture (string theory)
- Piermaria Oddone
- Piero Giorgio Bordoni
- Pierre-Gilles de Gennes
- Pierre-Michel Duffieux
- Pierre-Simon Laplace
- Pierre Aigrain
- Pierre Angénieux
- Pierre Auger Observatory
- Pierre Bertholon de Saint-Lazare
- Pierre Bouguer
- Pierre Curie
- Pierre Goldschmidt
- Pierre Henri Hugoniot
- Pierre Hohenberg
- Pierre Louis Dulong
- Pierre Louis Maupertuis
- Pierre Perrault (scientist)
- Pierre Polinière
- Pierre Prévost
- Pierre Ramond
- Pierre Victor Auger
- Pierre Weiss
- Pierson–Moskowitz spectrum
- Pieter Kok
- Pieter Rijke
- Pieter Zeeman
- Pieter van Musschenbroek
- Piezoelectric coefficient
- Piezoelectricity
- Piezoresistive effect
- Piezoresponse force microscopy
- Pilot wave
- Pin group
- Pinch (magnetic fusion)
- Pinch (plasma physics)
- Pincushion distortion
- Pink noise
- Pinning force
- Piola-Kirchhoff stress tensor
- Pion
- Pion decay constant
- Pioneer anomaly
- Pionium
- Pipe flow
- Pipe network analysis
- Pis'ma v Astronomicheskii Zhurnal
- Piston (optics)
- Pit (nuclear weapon)
- Pitch-up
- Pitch drop experiment
- Pitching moment
- Pitot tube
- Piyare Jain
- Planar array radar
- Planar laser-induced fluorescence
- Planck's law
- Planck (spacecraft)
- Planck angular frequency
- Planck charge
- Planck constant
- Planck current
- Planck density
- Planck energy
- Planck epoch
- Planck force
- Planck impedance
- Planck length
- Planck mass
- Planck matter
- Planck momentum
- Planck particle
- Planck postulate
- Planck power
- Planck pressure
- Planck radiation
- Planck scale
- Planck temperature
- Planck time
- Planck units
- Planck voltage
- Plane mirror
- Plane of incidence
- Plane of reference
- Plane wave expansion method
- PlanetPhysics
- Planetarium hypothesis
- Planetary and Space Science
- Planetary nebula
- Planetary nebula luminosity function
- Planets beyond Neptune
- Plasma (physics)
- Plasma Physics Laboratory (Saskatchewan)
- Plasma Science Society of India
- Plasma Sources Science and Technology
- Plasma acceleration
- Plasma channel
- Plasma cleaning
- Plasma containment
- Plasma cosmology
- Plasma diagnostics
- Plasma facing material
- Plasma fountain
- Plasma gasification
- Plasma globe
- Plasma lamp
- Plasma modeling
- Plasma oscillation
- Plasma parameter
- Plasma parameters
- Plasma propulsion engine
- Plasma recombination
- Plasma scaling
- Plasma source
- Plasma speaker
- Plasma stability
- Plasma stealth
- Plasma torch
- Plasma weapon
- Plasma window
- Plasmaron
- Plasmasphere
- Plasmat lens
- Plasmoid
- Plasmon
- Plasmonic cover
- Plasmonic metamaterials
- Plasmonic solar cell
- Plastic-clad silica fiber
- Plastic Fantastic: How the Biggest Fraud in Physics Shook the Scientific World
- Plastic bending
- Plastic deformation in solids
- Plastic magnet
- Plastic moment
- Plasticity (physics)
- Plastometer
- Plate tectonics
- Plateau–Rayleigh instability
- Platinum Metals Review
- Plato
- Platteville Atmospheric Observatory
- Plebanski action
- Plekton
- Pleuger rudder
- Plug flow
- Plum pudding model
- Plume (hydrodynamics)
- Plummer model
- Plus minus method
- Plutonium
- Plutonium(IV) oxide
- Plutonium-238
- Plutonium-239
- Pneumatic barrier
- Pneumatic circuit
- Pneumatic cylinder
- Pneumatic flow control
- Pneumatic motor
- Pockels effect
- Pohlmeyer charge
- Poincaré Seminar
- Poincaré Seminars
- Poincaré group
- Poincaré map
- Poincaré recurrence theorem
- Poincaré–Bendixson theorem
- Poincaré–Lindstedt method
- Poinsot's ellipsoid
- Point charge
- Point mass
- Point particle
- Point source
- Point source (light)
- Point spread function
- Poise
- Poisson's equation
- Poisson's ratio
- Poisson bracket
- Poisson–Boltzmann equation
- Pol Duwez
- Pol Swings
- Polar cyclone
- Polar mesosphere summer echoes
- Polar moment of inertia
- Polar orbit
- Polar vortex
- Polar wander
- Polar wind
- Polarimetry
- Polariton
- Polariton superfluid
- Polarity (disambiguation)
- Polarizability
- Polarizable vacuum
- Polarization-division multiplexing
- Polarization (waves)
- Polarization density
- Polarization in astronomy
- Polarization mode dispersion
- Polarization spectroscopy
- Polarized target
- Polarizer
- Polaroid (polarizer)
- Polaron
- Polhode
- Polyakov action
- Polyamorphism
- Polychromatic
- Polychromator
- Polykarp Kusch
- Polymer Bulletin
- Polymer physics
- Polymer science
- Polymer solar cell
- Polymeric liquid crystal
- Polyphase coil
- Polyphase system
- Polytrope
- Polytropic process
- Polywater
- Polywell
- Pomeranchuk Prize
- Pomeron
- Ponderomotive energy
- Ponderomotive force
- Pons-Fleischmann experiment
- Pontecorvo–Maki–Nakagawa–Sakata matrix
- Poole–Frenkel effect
- Pople notation
- Population I Cepheid
- Population I Cepheids
- Population inversion
- Poromechanics
- Pororoca
- Portevin–Le Chatelier effect
- Posidonius
- Position and momentum space
- Position operator
- Position space
- Positive displacement meter
- Positive energy theorem
- Positive pressure
- Positron
- Positron emission
- Positron emission tomography
- Positronium
- Positronium hydride
- Post-Hartree–Fock
- Post-Newtonian expansion
- Post Office Box (electricity)
- Postulates of special relativity
- Potassium titanyl phosphate
- Potential
- Potential difference
- Potential energy
- Potential energy surface
- Potential flow
- Potential gradient
- Potential temperature
- Potential theory
- Potential vorticity
- Potential well
- Potentiometric surface
- Potsdam Denkschrift
- Potts model
- Poul la Cour
- Pound–Rebka experiment
- Powder-in-tube
- Powder diffraction
- Power-law fluid
- Power-law index profile
- Power-to-weight ratio
- Power (physics)
- Power density
- Power history
- Power number
- Power optimizer
- Powered hang glider
- Poynting's theorem
- Poynting vector
- Pp-wave spacetime
- Prabhakar Misra
- Prabhu Lal Bhatnagar
- Pran Nath
- Prandtl-Glauert method
- Prandtl number
- Prandtl–Glauert singularity
- Prandtl–Glauert transformation
- Prandtl–Meyer expansion fan
- Prandtl–Meyer function
- Praveen Chaudhari
- Pre-echo
- Pre-main-sequence star
- Precession
- Precision Array for Probing the Epoch of Reionization
- Precision tests of QED
- Predhiman Krishan Kaw
- Predictability
- Predrag Cvitanović
- Preferential concentration
- Preferred frame
- Pregeometry (physics)
- Premelting
- Preon
- Preon star
- Present
- Presentism (philosophy of time)
- Pressure
- Pressure-correction method
- Pressure-fed engine (rocket)
- Pressure-gradient force
- Pressure-sensitive paint
- Pressure coefficient
- Pressure drop
- Pressure exchanger
- Pressure experiment
- Pressure head
- Pressure measurement
- Pressure volume diagram
- Press–Schechter formalism
- Primakoff effect
- Primary field
- Primary flow element
- Primitive cell
- Primitive equations
- Primon gas
- Primordial black hole
- Primordial isocurvature baryon model
- Primordial nuclide
- Primum Mobile
- Princeton Plasma Physics Laboratory
- Princeton ocean model
- Principal axis (mechanics)
- Principal quantum number
- Principle of Calorimetry
- Principle of corresponding states
- Principle of inertia (physics)
- Principle of least action
- Principle of locality
- Principle of material objectivity
- Principle of maximum entropy
- Principle of maximum work
- Principle of minimum energy
- Principle of relativity
- Principles of Quantum Mechanics
- Prism (optics)
- Prism compressor
- Probability amplitude
- Probability current
- Probing Lensing Anomalies Network
- Proca action
- Proceedings of SPIE
- Proceedings of the Physical Society
- Proceedings of the USSR Academy of Sciences
- Process function
- Prodicus
- Prof. Eleftheriades
- Professor Eleftheriades
- Progress in Electromagnetics Research
- Progress in Materials Science
- Progress in Optics
- Progress in Physics
- Progress of Theoretical Physics
- Progress of Theoretical Physics Supplement
- Project Mohole
- Project Tuva
- Projectile motion
- Projection method (fluid dynamics)
- Projective superspace
- Prompt critical
- Prompt gamma neutron activation analysis
- Prompt neutron
- Prony equation
- Propagation constant
- Propagation delay
- Propagator
- Propellant mass fraction
- Proper acceleration
- Proper frame
- Proper length
- Proper motion
- Proper orbital elements
- Proper time
- Proper velocity
- Proportional counter
- Propulsion
- Propulsive efficiency
- Prosper-René Blondlot
- Protogalaxy
- Proton
- Proton-to-electron mass ratio
- Proton Synchrotron
- Proton Synchrotron Booster
- Proton decay
- Proton emission
- Proton spin crisis
- Protonium
- Proton–gyromagnetic ratio
- Proton–proton chain reaction
- Protoplanetary nebula
- Protostar
- Proximity effect (atomic physics)
- Proximity effect (audio)
- Przybylski's Star
- Pseudo-Anosov map
- Pseudo-Euclidean space
- Pseudo-Goldstone boson
- Pseudo-Riemannian manifold
- Pseudo Stirling cycle
- Pseudogap
- Pseudophakic photic phenomena
- Pseudopotential
- Pseudorapidity
- Pseudoscalar
- Pseudoscalar meson
- Pseudotensor
- Pseudovector
- Pseudovector meson
- Psi meson
- Psychic determinism
- Psychoacoustics
- Psychrometrics
- Ptychography
- Pucadyil Ittoop John
- Pulsar
- Pulsar kicks
- Pulsatile flow
- Pulse (physics)
- Pulse forming network
- Pulse height analyzer
- Pulsed EPR
- Pulsed field gradient
- Pulsed laser deposition
- Pulsed power
- Pulsometer steam pump
- Pump
- Pumplinx
- Purcell effect
- Purdue University Reactor Number One
- Pure bending
- Pure gauge
- Pure shear
- Pure spinor
- Pure state
- Purity (gas)
- Purity (quantum mechanics)
- Pwpaw
- Pyotr Kapitsa
- Pyotr Lebedev
- Pyotr Valentinovich Trusov
- Pyranometer
- Pyrgeometer
- Pyroelectric crystal
- Pyroelectric fusion
- Pyroelectricity
- Pyrometer
- Pyrometry
- Pythagoras
- Pythagorean hammers
- Pål Brekke
- Péclet number
- P–n junction
