= Fulvio Parmigiani =

Italian physicist

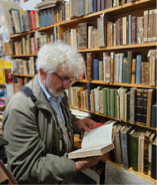
- Fulvio Parmigiani at the library of Triest
- Born: Fulvio Parmigiani
- Scientific career
- Fields: Non-equilibrium thermodynamics; Photoinduced phase transitions; Spectroscopies of strongly electron-correlated systems
- Website: fulvioparmigiani.com

Fulvio Parmigiani is an Italian physicist and researcher.

== Career ==
In 1993, Parmigiani became a full professor of experimental physics at the Polytechnic University of Milan and studied non-equilibrium electron gas dynamics in metals. From 1997 to 2004, he was a professor of condensed matter at the Faculty of Science at the Catholic University. Parmigiani served as a professor of condensed matter at the Department of Physics within the Faculty of Science at the University of Trieste, from 2005 to 2019. He has also served as an editor for Nuclear Instruments and Methods in Physics Research Section A since 2006 and for Physics Reports since 2012. Parmigiani was awarded with the Zernike professor by the University of Groningen, in 2012. He has been a Fellow of the American Physical Society since 2013.

Since 2019, Parmigiani has been professor emeritus at the University of Trieste and an Elettra Fellow, having previously served from 2013 to 2024 as professor of physics at the International Faculty of the University of Cologne.

His research encompasses non-equilibrium physics, photoinduced phase transitions, strongly correlated electron systems, studies of magnetic, quantum, and emerging materials, as well as unconventional superconductors. Parmigiani held the positions of project director and head of Science at FERMI, where he contributed to the development of the first fully coherent, seeded free-electron laser operating in the soft X-ray regime.

He has authored over 270 publications, with more than 14,000 citations and an h-index of 60.

== Selected research and projects ==
- 1998-Present: Research in time-resolved spectroscopy and ultra-fast processes included experiments in time-resolved optical and photoelectron spectroscopy. This work encompassed super-continuum time-resolved optical spectroscopy, as well as both linear and non-linear time-resolved photoemission techniques. Additional studies focused on time- and spin-resolved photoemission and the investigation of image potential states in metals and graphite, with the objective of elucidating ultrafast phenomena in condensed and soft matter systems.
- 2001-2015: Contributions to free-electron laser (FEL) facilities and photon science included involvement in the conceptual design and scientific development of major projects such as LUX (LBNL), FERMI@Elettra, and NGLS (LBNL). These efforts encompassed advancements in FEL photon beam transport, photon beam diagnostics, and the development of experimental end-stations for FEL applications.
- 2002‐2005: work was carried out within the Accelerator and Fusion Research Division (AFRD) of Lawrence Berkeley National Laboratory (LBNL), contributing to the conceptual design of an advanced coherent X-ray radiation source based on a recirculating linear accelerator (LINAC). The proposed photon source, part of the LUX project, was intended to produce sub-picosecond coherent radiation spanning from the extreme ultraviolet (EUV) to 10 keV. Related developments were presented at the Particle Accelerator Conference (PAC) in 2003. doi:10.1109/PAC.2003.1288874

== Selected publications ==
- US4526465A, Corti, Mario & Parmigiani, Fulvio, "Apparatus for detecting the displacements of points of excited structures", issued 1985-07-02
- Corti, M.; Parmigiani, F.; Botcherby, S. C. L. (1982-09-08). "Description of a coherent light technique to detect the tangential and radial vibrations of an arch dam". Journal of Sound and Vibration. 84 (1): 35–45. doi:10.1016/0022-460X(82)90430-8. ISSN 0022-460X.
- Cavalleri, G. C.; Parmigiani, F.; Spoletini, E. (1984-01-01). "Prediction of new anomalous optical band in small metal clusters". Solid State Communications. 49 (2): 173–175. doi:10.1016/0038-1098(84)90789-0. ISSN 0038-1098.
- Parmigiani, Fluvio; Kay, Eric; Bagus, Paul S.; Nelin, Constance J. (1985-01-01). "Core binding energies for clusters deposited on different insulating substrates: esca spectra and theoretical electronic structure studies". Journal of Electron Spectroscopy and Related Phenomena. 36 (3): 257–267. doi:10.1016/0368-2048(85)80023-2. ISSN 0368-2048.
- Parmigiani, F.; Kay, E.; Huang, T. C.; Perrin, J.; Jurich, M.; Swalen, and J. D. (1986-01-15). "Optical and electrical properties of thin silver films grown under ion bombardment". Physical Review B. 33 (2): 879–888. doi:10.1103/PhysRevB.33.879.
- Damascelli, Andrea; Gabetta, Giuseppe; Lumachi, Alberto; Fini, Lorenzo; Parmigiani, Fulvio (1996-09-01). "Multiphoton electron emission from Cu and W: An angle-resolved study". Physical Review B. 54 (9): 6031–6034. doi:10.1103/PhysRevB.54.6031.
- Giannetti, Claudio; Cilento, Federico; Conte, Stefano Dal; Coslovich, Giacomo; Ferrini, Gabriele; Molegraaf, Hajo; Raichle, Markus; Liang, Ruixing; Eisaki, Hiroshi; Greven, Martin; Damascelli, Andrea; van der Marel, Dirk; Parmigiani, Fulvio (2011-06-14). "Revealing the high-energy electronic excitations underlying the onset of high-temperature superconductivity in cuprates". Nature Communications. 2 (1): 353. doi:10.1038/ncomms1354. ISSN 2041-1723.
- Dal Conte, S.; Giannetti, C.; Coslovich, G.; Cilento, F.; Bossini, D.; Abebaw, T.; Banfi, F.; Ferrini, G.; Eisaki, H.; Greven, M.; Damascelli, A.; van der Marel, D.; Parmigiani, F. (2012-03-30). "Disentangling the Electronic and Phononic Glue in a High-Tc Superconductor". Science. 335 (6076): 1600–1603. doi:10.1126/science.1216765.
- Cilento, Federico; Manzoni, Giulia; Sterzi, Andrea; Peli, Simone; Ronchi, Andrea; Crepaldi, Alberto; Boschini, Fabio; Cacho, Cephise; Chapman, Richard; Springate, Emma; Eisaki, Hiroshi; Greven, Martin; Berciu, Mona; Kemper, Alexander F.; Damascelli, Andrea (2018-02-23). "Dynamics of correlation-frozen antinodal quasiparticles in superconducting cuprates". Science Advances. 4 (2) eaar1998. doi:10.1126/sciadv.aar1998. PMC 5834002. PMID 29507885.
