= Christopher Ober =

American/Canadian materials scientist and engineer

Christopher K. Ober
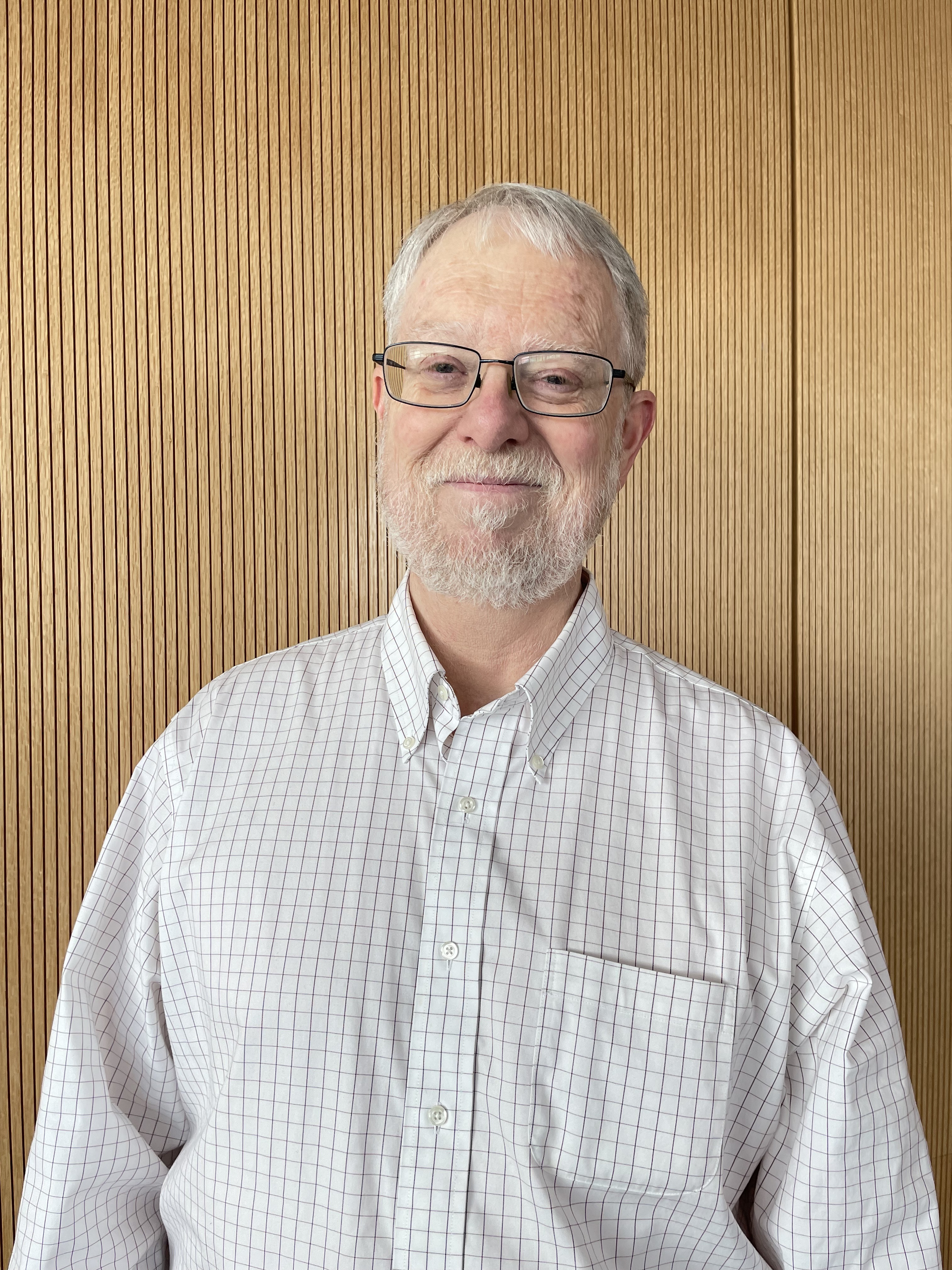
- Christopher Ober, at an event at Cornell University in March 2023
- Education: University of Massachusetts Amherst (Ph.D., M.S.); University of Waterloo (B.Sc.)
- Scientific career
- Workplaces: Xerox, Cornell University, National Science Foundation

Christopher Kemper Ober (born November 1, 1954) is an American/Canadian materials scientist and engineer. He is the Francis Norwood Bard Professor of Materials Engineering at Cornell University, Ithaca, NY, Cornell University and was until July 2023 the Director of the Cornell NanoScale Science and Technology Facility. From May 2024 to May 2026 he was on leave from Cornell and served as a rotator at the National Science Foundation (NSF) where he was a program director of the DMR Polymers program. He has returned to Cornell and is director of the department of Materials Science & Engineering. Among other positions at Cornell, he has served as Interim Dean of Engineering (January 2009-July 2010) and Director of the Department of Materials Science & Engineering in the Cornell University College of Engineering (January 2000-December 2003). Prior to joining Cornell University, he was a researcher at the Xerox Research Centre of Canada.

Ober was awarded a B.Sc. degree in 1978 by the University of Waterloo (Waterloo, Ontario, Canada), with a major in Honors Chemistry (Co-Operative Program). He received his M.S. (1980) and Ph.D. (1982) degrees in Polymer Science & Engineering from the University of Massachusetts (Amherst).

Ober was elected to the National Academy of Engineering in 2023. In 2024 he was elected to the Canadian Academy of Engineering. He is an Elected Fellow of the American Association for the Advancement of Science, a Fellow of the American Physical Society, a Fellow of the American Chemical Society, a Senior Member of SPIE and was from 2018-2021 an Elected Member of the Executive Committee of the International Union of Pure and Applied Chemistry. He serves on the editorial boards of Polymer Bulletin, Polymers for Advanced Technologies, and Green Materials. From 1995 to 2010 he was an associate editor of Macromolecules. He has directed more than 50 Cornell Ph.D. dissertations, worked with over 50 post-doctoral associates, has co-authored or co-edited eight books or reports, has co-authored more than 600 refereed articles, and shares more than 40 patents.

Ober's research interests center on the synthesis, processing, and characterization of functional polymers with tailored nano- and molecular architectures for targeted properties. Detailed evaluation of polymer behavior for the design of superior macromolecular materials includes synchrotron-based characterization. Synthetic tools include living polymerization methods such as anionic, ATRP and living radical polymerization. Of special interest are systems that undergo "bottom-up" self-organization/assembly, including liquid crystalline polymers and block copolymers as well as "top down" lithographic materials. Environmentally and biologically friendly materials are now a major focus of research.
