= Magnetization reversal by circularly polarized light =

Discovered only as recently as 2006 by C.D. Stanciu and F. Hansteen and published in Physical Review Letters, this effect is generally called all-optical magnetization reversal. This magnetization reversal technique refers to a method of reversing magnetization in a magnet simply by circularly polarized light and where the magnetization direction is controlled by the light helicity. In particular, the direction of the angular momentum of the photons would set the magnetization direction without the need of an external magnetic field. In fact, this process could be seen as similar to magnetization reversal by spin injection (see also spintronics). The only difference is that now, the angular momentum is supplied by the circularly polarized photons instead of the polarized electrons.

Although experimentally demonstrated, the mechanism responsible for this all-optical magnetization reversal is not clear yet and remains a subject of debate. Thus, it is not yet clear whether an Inverse Einstein–de Haas effect is responsible for this switching or a stimulated Raman-like coherent optical scattering process. However, because phenomenologically is the inverse effect of the magneto-optical Faraday effect, magnetization reversal by circularly polarized light is referred to as the inverse Faraday effect.

Early studies in plasmas, paramagnetic solids, dielectric magnetic materials and ferromagnetic semiconductors demonstrated that excitation of a medium with a circularly polarized laser pulse corresponds to the action of an effective magnetic field. Yet, before the experiments of Stanciu and Hansteen, all-optical controllable magnetization reversal in a stable magnetic state was considered impossible.

In quantum field theory and quantum chemistry the effect where the angular momentum associated to the circular motion of the photons induces an angular momentum in the electrons is called photomagneton. This axial magnetic field with the origins in the angular momentum of the photons has been sometimes referred in the literature as the field B.

Magnetization reversal by circularly polarized light is the fastest known way to reverse magnetization, and therefore to store data: magnetization reversal is induced on the femtosecond time scale - that translates to a potential of about 100 TBit/s data storage speeds.
