= PIPT =

PIPT or PiPT may refer to:

- Physically indexed, physically tagged, a type of CPU cache
- PiPT or propylisopropyltryptamine]], a psychedelic tryptamine derivative
- Photoinduced phase transitions, a technique used in solid-state physics

== See also ==
- Pip-T or pip-Tryptamine, a serotonin receptor modulator
