= Trusov =

Trusov (Russian: Трусов) is a Russian masculine surname, its feminine counterpart is Trusova. It may refer to

- Alexandra Trusova (born 2004), Russian figure skater
- Anastasia Trusova, Russian model and beauty pageant titleholder
- Andrii Trusov (born 2000), Ukrainian Paralympic swimmer
- Nikolay Trusov (born 1985), Russian racing cyclist
- Pyotr Trusov (born 1948), Russian physicist
