= Timothy Ferris bibliography =

List of works by or about Timothy Ferris, American science writer.

== Books ==
- Ferris, Timothy (1977). The red limit : the search for the edge of the universe. William Morrow. ISBN 9780688031763.
- — (2010). The science of liberty : democracy, reason, and the laws of nature. HarperCollins.
- Timothy Ferris (2002). Seeing in the Dark: How Backyard Stargazers Are Probing Deep into the Universe and Guarding Earth from Interplanetary Peril. Simon & Schuster. ISBN 0-684-86579-3.
- Timothy Ferris, ed. (2001). Best American Science Writing 2001. HarperCollins. ISBN 0-06-093648-7.
- Timothy Ferris (2001). Life Beyond Earth. Simon & Schuster. ISBN 978-0-684-84937-9.
- Timothy Ferris (1997). The Whole Shebang: A State-of-the-Universe(s) Report. Simon & Schuster. ISBN 978-0-684-83861-8.
- Timothy Ferris (1993). The Universe & Eye. Ingram Pinn (illust.). Pavilion Books. ISBN 978-0-517-15572-1.
- Timothy Ferris (1992). The Mind's Sky: Human Intelligence in a Cosmic Context. Bantam Books. ISBN 978-0-553-37133-8.
- Timothy Ferris; Clifton Fadiman, eds. (1991). World Treasury of Physics, Astronomy, and Mathematics. Little Brown. ISBN 978-0-316-28129-4.
- Timothy Ferris (1988). Coming of Age in the Milky Way. William Morrow & Co. ISBN 978-0-688-05889-0.
- Bruce Porter, Timothy Ferris (1988). The Practice of Journalism. Prentice-Hall. ISBN 978-0-13-693706-7.
- Timothy Ferris (1984). SpaceShots. Pantheon Books. ISBN 0-394-53890-0.
- Timothy Ferris (1980). Galaxies. Sierra Club Books. ISBN 978-0-87156-273-9.
- Carl Sagan, Frank D. Drake, Ann Druyan, Timothy Ferris, Jon Lomberg, and Linda Salzman Sagan (1978). Murmurs of Earth: The Voyager Interstellar Record. Random House. ISBN 978-0-345-31536-6.

== Articles and essays ==
- "Timothy Ferris on Voyagers' Never-Ending Journey," Smithsonian magazine, May 2012.
- “Sun Struck,” a piece on the solar storms (solar flares) National Geographic, June 2012.
- “Dancing in the Dark,” National Geographic, December 2011.
- Ferris, Timothy (October 13, 2011). "The World of the Intellectual vs. The World of the Engineer". Wired.
- "Why I Write: Timothy Ferris on Writing to Learn", National Writing Project September 23, 2011.
- "An Experiment in Reason: True Liberalism is a proposition, not a dogma," Oxford American, Issue 70, 2010.
- "Worlds Apart: Seeking New Earths", National Geographic, December 2009, pg 78.
- “Raising Heaven,” National Geographic, November 2007.
- “Seeing in the Dark,” HighDef magazine, Sept/Oct 2007.
- “Mix Tape of the Gods,” The New York Times Op-Ed page, September 5, 2007.
- Liner notes for the music album “Private Investigations – The Very Best of Dire Straits and Mark Knopfler”, November 2005.
- “Sedan Delivery,” Automobile, July 2005.
- Foreword to Michelle Feynman, ed., Perfectly Reasonable Deviations from the Beaten Track: The Letters of Richard P. Feynman. New York: Basic Books, 2005.
- “C6 Appeal,” Automobile, September 2004.
- “The Waiting Game,” Automobile, April 2004.
- Foreword to Field Guide for Science Writers, 2004.
- Foreword to Hunter S. Thompson’s Kingdom of Fear. New York: Simon & Schuster, 2003.
- “A New Pathway to the Stars,” The New York Times Op-Ed page, Sunday, December 21, 2003; reprinted in the International Herald Tribune and the Long Beach Press-Telegram.
- “The Wonder of Seeing Red,” Los Angeles Times Opinion page, August 24, 2003.
- “’Taken’ Off,” Skeptical Inquirer, March/April 2003.
- “At Dawn, the Columbia,” The New York Times Op-Ed page, February 3, 2003, and other newspapers.
- “The Whole Shebang: How Science Produced the Big Bang Model,” from The Whole Shebang, American Educator, Fall 2002.
- “Killer Rocks From Outer Space,” adapted from Seeing in the Dark, Reader's Digest, October 2002.
- “Voyager: A Message From Earth,” The Planetary Report, September/October 2002.
- “Astronomy’s New Stars,” from Seeing in the Dark, Smithsonian, September 2002; reprinted in The Best American Science And Nature Writing 2003.
- “On Science Writing,” Physics in Perspective, vol. 4 (2002) 1, 3–12, February 2002.
- Foreword to James Trefil and Margaret Hindle Hazen, Good Seeing: A Century of Science at the Carnegie Institution of Washington 1902–2002. Washington, Joseph Henry Press, 2002.
- “Infinite Loop,” Yahoo Internet Life, September 2001.
- Introduction to Celestial Nights: Visions of an Ancient Land, by Neil Folberg. New York, Aperture, 2001.
- “Snafu Snared, Scientists Say,” ScienceWriters, Spring 2001.
- “Concerning John Archibald Wheeler,” Contentville.com, February 2001.
- “Reforming Voting Machine Technology,” Contentville.com, January 2001.
- “Five Gs and a 125-Pound Head,” Men's Journal, January 2001.
- “Stars and Pyramids,” Contentville.com, December 2000.
- “Bush and Gore on Science and Technology,” Contentville.com, October 2000.
- “Many Questions, Some Answers,” Forbes ASAP, October 2, 2000.
- “Faster Than a Speeding Unser,” Men's Journal, September 2000.
- Contributions to “What Are the Grand Questions of Science?” and “What Are the Next Breakthroughs in Science?” in Robert Lawrence Kuhn, editor, Closer to Truth. New York: McGraw Hill, 2000.
- “The Sinking of the Kursk,” Contentville.com, September 1, 2000.
- “Precious Metal,” Automobile, September 2000.
- “Switching the Light Fantastic,” Forbes ASAP, August 21, 2000.
- “Where Are They?” Contentville.com, August 1, 2000.
- “On Stargazing,” Contentville.com, July 25, 2000.
- “How Will the Universe End? Time, April 10, 2000.
- The Light and the Dark, Automobile, March 2000.
- A Space Station? The New York Times Magazine, November 28, 1999. Reprinted in MAX Magazine, Germany, 1999.
- If Forced to Choose, American Scientist, November–December 1999.
- The Cruel Sport, Talk, November 1999.
- The Last Bit: Is Information Theory the Answer to Everything? Forbes ASAP Big Issue IV, October 4, 1999.
- Personal Places, National Geographic Traveler, October 1999.
- How to Predict Everything, The New Yorker, July 12, 1999.
- Introduction to The Scientific American Book of Astronomy, The Lyons Press, 1999.
- Whine of the Region: If You Want to Know Why a Ferrari is a Ferrari, Just Drive One in its Homeland, Automobile, July 1999.
- Interstellar Spaceflight, Scientific American Presents: The Future of Space Exploration, Spring 1999.
- Communication With High-Performance Automobiles, Wired, January 1999.
- NASA’s Mission to Nowhere, Op-ed page, The New York Times, Sunday, November 29, 1998.
- The Three Immensities, Forbes ASAP Big Issue III, November 30, 1998.
- Seeing in the Dark, The New Yorker, August 10, 1998.
- Not Rocket Science, The New Yorker, July 20, 1998.
- Flight of the Bumblers, Op-ed page, The New York Times, September 24, 1997.
- The Space Gamble, The New York Review of Books, September 25, 1997; reprinted in Le Recherche, Paris, November 1997.
- Inflating the Cosmos, Astronomy, July 1997.
- The Wrong Stuff, The New Yorker, April 14, 1997.
- The Risks and Rewards of Popularizing Science, The Chronicle of Higher Education, April 4, 1997; reprinted in The Informal Science Review, May/June 1997.
- The Moon's Big Splash, Natural History, March 1997.
- Is This the End? The New Yorker, January 27, 1997; reprinted in Germany and Australia and in McGraw-Hill=s Quantitative Reasoning Workbook., 1997.
- Weirdness Makes Sense, The New York Times Magazine, Sep 29, 1996.
- A Message From Mars, The New Yorker, August 19, 1996.
- Express Train of the Sky, Op-Ed page, San Francisco Examiner and other newspapers, June 4, 1996.
- Foreword, Robert P. Crease and Charles C. Mann, The Second Creation: Makers of the Revolution in Twentieth-Century Physics, Rutgers University Press, 1996.
- Alien Ambition, The New Yorker, February 12, 1996.
- Apollo 13 and the Strip-Mining of American Culture, Newsday, July 11, 1995; reprinted in the Washington Times, Minneapolis Star Tribune, Phoenix Gazette, other papers.
- At the Cosmological Conference, The New Yorker, May 15, 1995.
- The Interpreter, lead essay in Ted Anton and Rick McCourt, editors, The New Science Journalists: The Future of Our Planet, Our Species, and Our Psyches, From the Most Renowned Literary Science Journalists Working Today, New York, Ballantine, 1995.
- Science and Genesis, chapter in Clifford N. Matthews and Roy Abraham Varghese, editors, Cosmic Beginnings and Human Ends: Where Science and Religion Meet, Chicago, Open Court, 1995.
- "Earthbound," The New Yorker, August 1, 1994.
- "Ayrton Senna's Intense, Deadly World," San Francisco Examiner Op-Ed page, Sunday, May 15, 1994.
- "Seeing Stars," The New Yorker, January 31, 1994.
- "Evolution of Interstellar Communications Systems," chapter in Bang: The Evolving Cosmos: Nobel Conference XXVII, Richard Fuller, editor, University Press of America, 1994.
- "The Future is Coming," The New York Times Op-Ed page, November 12, 1993.
- "Babbling Brooks and Talking Dogs," The New York Times Op-Ed page, June 8, 1993; reprinted in the San Jose Mercury News and other newspapers.
- "Life, the Universe and Me," The Times, London, February 20, 1993.
- "When Science is the Star," The New York Times, Arts & Leisure section, Sunday, August 16, 1992.
- "Total," The New Yorker, July 29, 1991.
- "The Space Telescope: A Sign of Intelligent Life," The New York Times, Week in Review section, front page, Sunday, April 29, 1990.
- "Zen and R. H. Blyth," The Nation, April 30, 1990.
- "Grand Unification Theories," in Holcomb B. Noble, editor, Next: The Coming Era in Science, Boston, Little, Brown, 1988.
- "Where Are We Going? Notes on the Absolute Motion of the Solar System Through Space." Sky & Telescope, May 1987.
- "The Year of the Red Lights: Challenger, Chernobyl, the Titanic, and 'Star Wars,'" Life, January 1987.
- "Albert Einstein's Annus Mirabilis," Science 84 fifth anniversary issue, November 1984; reprinted in Annual Edition: Western Civilization, Vol. 2, 1985.
- "Mind Over Matter: The Singular Stephen Hawking," Vanity Fair, June 1984; reprinted in The Journalist, March 1985.
- "The Other Einstein," Science 83, October 1983; reprinted in A Passion to Know, Allen L. Hammond, editor, New York, Scribner's, 1984.
- "Beyond Newton and Einstein: On the Frontiers of Physics," The New York Times Magazine, September 26, 1982.
- "The Perfect Circle," Science Digest, July 1981.
- "A Conversation With Lewis Thomas," Smithsonian, April 1980.
- "Navigators Who Probe the Mysteries of Deep Space," The New York Times Magazine, April l, 1979; reprinted in Science of the Times 3, New York, Arno Press, 1979.
- "Crucibles of the Cosmos," The New York Times Magazine, January 14, 1979; New York Times Syndicate, 1979; reprinted in Reader's Digest, May 1979; Science of the Times 3, 1979; The Living World of Nature, Reader's Digest Press, 1980.
- "Seeking an End to Cosmic Loneliness," The New York Times Magazine, October 23, 1977; reprinted in Science of the Times 2, 1979.
- "The Odyssey and the Ecstasy: The Viking's Search for Life on Mars," Rolling Stone, April 7, 1977; reprinted in Rolling Stone: The 70s, Little, Brown, 1998.
- "The Universe as an Ocean of Thought," Harper's, July 1975.
- "All That Glitters is not God," Rolling Stone, January 30, 1975; reprinted in Paul Scanlon, editor, Reporting: The Rolling Stone Style, New York, Anchor Press/Doubleday, 1977.
- Interview with Erich von Daniken, Playboy, August 1974.
- "Raquel Welch Speaks Her Mind," Rolling Stone, August 29, 1974.
- "Where Does it all End? A Debate About the Edge of the Universe," Harper's, June 1974.
- "A Special Report: Is the Free Press In Danger?" Rolling Stone, April 26, 1973.
- "How Do We Know Where We Are If We've Never Been Anywhere Else? Cosmological Perspectives," Rolling Stone, March 15, 1973.
- "A Conversation With Carl Sagan," Rolling Stone, June 7, 1973; reprinted in Tom Head, ed., Conversations With Carl Sagan, 2006.
- " David Brinkley vs. Woeful Ignorance," Rolling Stone, September 14, 1972.
- "Hometown Folks: Letters from American Political Prisoners," Rolling Stone, March 16, 1972; The Rolling Stone Reader, New York, Warner Library, 1974.
- “Robert Johnson,” Rolling Stone, February 4, 1971.
- “An Evening With Muhammad Ali,” New York Post, March 22, 1971.
- "Turning Off the Sun," New York Post Magazine, March 7, 1970.
- "Mars: Can It Sustain Life?" New York Post Magazine, July 23, 1969.
- Ferris, Timothy (August 2017). "Fantastic voyage : deep in space, two intrepid travelers turn 40". Explore.Space. National Geographic. 232 (2): 22–23. Archived from the original on July 17, 2017.
