= Phil Morrison =

Phil Morrison may refer to:

- Phil Morrison (yacht designer) (born 1946), British yacht designer
- Phil Morrison (director), American film and television director
- Phil Morrison (driver) (born 1977), British race driver
- Phil Morrison (baseball) (1894–1955), American baseball player
- Philip Morrison (1915–2005), American physicist
- Philip J. Morrison (born 1950), American physicist
- Philip Crosbie Morrison (1900–1958), Australian naturalist, educator and conservationist

== See also ==
- Phillip Morrison (born 1984), Brazilian swimmer of American descent
