= The Picture =

The Picture may refer to:

- The Picture (Massinger play), a 1630 play by Philip Massinger
- The Picture (Ionesco play), a 1955 play by Eugène Ionesco
- The Picture (magazine), a former Australian weekly men's magazine
- "The Picture" (story), a short story by Erskine Caldwell, included in the 1933 collection We Are the Living
- The Pictures, an Australian alternative rock band
- "The Picture", a song by Editors from the CD single Smokers Outside the Hospital Doors

== See also ==
- Picture (disambiguation)
- Get the Picture (disambiguation)
