= Picture (disambiguation) =

A picture is an artifact that depicts or records visual perception.

Picture(s) may also refer to:

== Mathematics and science ==
- Picture (mathematics), a combinatorial structure
- Picture (string theory), a representation of states
- PICTURE clause, a COBOL data type

== Music ==
- Picture (band), a Dutch heavy metal band

=== Albums ===
- Picture (album), a 2005 album by Kino
- Pictures (Atlanta album), 1984
- Pictures (Jack DeJohnette album), 1976
- Pictures (John Michael Montgomery album), 2002
- Pictures (Katie Melua album), 2007
- Pictures (Leon Bolier album), 2008
- Pictures (Niels-Henning Ørsted Pedersen and Kenneth Knudsen album), 1977
- Pictures (Timo Maas album), 2005
- Pictures, a 2006 album by Tony Rich

=== Songs ===
- "Picture", a 2001 song by Kid Rock and Sheryl Crow
- "Pictures", a 2006 song by Sneaky Sound System
- "Pictures", a 1989 song by Tommy Keene from Based on Happy Times
- "Pictures", a 1995 song by Mojave 3 from Ask Me Tomorrow
- "Pictures", a 2002 song by System of a Down from Steal This Album!
- "Pictures", a 2007 song by Sia from Lady Croissant
- "Pictures", a 2010 song by AM Conspiracy from AM Conspiracy
- "Pictures", a 2013 song by Terry McDermott from Palmetto Heights
- "Pictures", a 2017 song by Europe from Walk the Earth
- "Pictures", a 2026 song by Gnarls Barkley from Atlanta

== Other media ==
=== Literature ===
- "Pictures" (short story), a 1917 short story by Katherine Mansfield
- Picture, a 1952 book by Lillian Ross

=== Film ===
- Film or motion picture
  - Movie theater, a building in which films are shown
- Pictures (film), a 1981 New Zealand film
- Picture (2026 film), an Indian comedy-drama

== See also ==
- The Picture (disambiguation)
- Image (disambiguation)
- Pictura: An Adventure in Art, a documentary film
