= Konrad Szaciłowski =

Polish chemist (born 1971)

- Born: 1971 (age 54–55); Kraków
- Education: Jagiellonian University
- Occupation: Chemist
- Employer: AGH University of Krakow

Konrad Szaciłowski (born 1971) is a chemist, academic teacher at the AGH University of Kraków, co-author of over a hundred research papers in peer-reviewed scientific journals.

== Biography ==
In 1995 he graduated in chemistry from the Jagiellonian University. In 2000 he obtained doctorate. In 2008 he obtained habilitation. In 2015 he was awarded with the professor degree. In 2004, together with Wojciech Macyk described the PEPS effect, a new phenomenon in semiconductor phophysics.

He published a couple of articles in the field of Catholic theology with a fictitious co-author Kapela Abdulayev Pilaka, including an article in Wschodni Rocznik Humanistyczny about John Paul II's alleged passion for collecting matches.
