= Paul John Ellis =

British physicist (1941–2005)

- Born: 25 May 1941; Northampton, UK
- Died: 25 May 2005 (aged 64); St. Louis Park, Minnesota (USA)
- Education: University of Bristol (BS); University of Manchester (PhD)
- Known for: Composition and Structure of Protoneutron Stars (Paper)
- Scientific career
- Fields: Stellar astrophysics, Nuclear physics
- Workplaces: University of Minnesota

Paul John Ellis (25 May 1941 – 20 February 2005) was a professor of physics at University of Minnesota for over 30 years. He is noted for his earlier work examining effective interactions inside nuclei, coupled channel approaches to nuclear reactions, and later work looking at dense nuclear matter inside neutron stars and developing a set of effective lagrangians that take into account scale and chiral symmetry.

== Selected publications ==
- Prakash, M; Bombaci, I; Prakash, M; Ellis, PJ; Lattimer, JM; Knorren, R (1997). "Composition and Structure of Protoneutron Stars". Physics Reports. 280 (1): 1. arXiv:nucl-th/9603042v1. Bibcode:1997PhR...280....1P. doi:10.1016/S0370-1573(96)00023-3.
- Heide, Erik K.; Rudaz, Serge & Paul J. Ellis (1994). "An effective Lagrangian with broken scale and chiral symmetry applied to nuclear matter and finite nuclei". Nuclear Physics A. 571 (4): 713–732. arXiv:nucl-th/9308002. Bibcode:1994NuPhA.571..713H. doi:10.1016/0375-9474(94)90717-X.
- Ellis, P. J. (1990). Trends in theoretical physics: Based on the 1988-89 Distinguished-Speaker Colloquium Series of the Theoretical Physics Institute at the University of Minnesota. Redwood City, Calif: Addison-Wesley.
