= Udo W. Pohl =

Udo W. Pohl is a German physicist who was Professor at Technische Universität Berlin. His work on semiconductor physics focuses on quantum dots.

== Education and career ==
Pohl studied physics at RWTH Aachen University, the Free University of Berlin, and Technische Universität Berlin, where he earned doctoral degree in 1988. His doctoral research involved optical spectroscopy of transition metal impurities in II-VI semiconductors.

In 1989, he became the group leader of the "Materials Lab" at the Institute of Solid State Physics at Technische Universität Berlin, which was later reorganized as the Center of Nanophotonics in 2004. His scientific work focuses particularly on the structural and optical properties of quantum dots based on II-VI and III-V compound semiconductors and their epitaxy. Using active GaAs-based III-V-quantum dots, novel devices such as lasers and single-photon emitters could be realised at the Institute of Solid State Physics with his involvement.

Pohl qualified as an assistant professor in 1999 with work on the epitaxy of semiconductors. In 2009, he was appointed adjunct professor of experimental physics at Technische Universität Berlin. Pohl is member of the German Physical Society and since 2017 serves as a co-editor of the Springer Series in Materials Science.

== Publications ==
In 2013, Pohl published the textbook Epitaxy of Semiconductors. He co-authored the Handbook Semiconductor Physics with Karl Wolfgang Böer, which was first published in 2018.

== Monographs ==
- Udo W. Pohl, Epitaxy of Semiconductors.
  1. Edition: Introduction to Physical Principles, Springer Heidelberg New York Dordrecht London, 2013. ISBN 978-3-642-32969-2.
  2. Edition: Physics and Fabrication of Heterostructures, Springer Nature Switzerland AG, Cham, Switzerland, 2020. ISBN 978-3-030-43868-5.
- Karl W. Böer, Udo W. Pohl, Semiconductor Physics.
  1. Edition: Springer International Publishing AG, Cham, Switzerland, 2018. ISBN 978-3-319-69148-0.
  2. Edition: Springer Nature Switzerland AG, Cham, Switzerland, 2023. ISBN 978-3-031-18285-3.

== Selected contributions to books ==
- U. W. Pohl, A. Strittmatter, A. Schliwa, M. Lehmann, T. Niermann, T. Heindel, S. Reitzenstein, M. Kantner, U. Bandelow, T. Koprucki, H.-J. Wünsche, Stressor-Induced Site Control of Quantum Dots for Single-Photon Sources. In: M. Kneissl, A. Knorr, S. Reitzenstein, A. Hoffmann (Eds.), Semiconductor Nanophotonics, pp. 52 – 90, Springer Nature, Cham Switzerland 2020.
- U. W. Pohl, Low-Dimensional Semiconductors. In: H. Warlimont, W. Martienssen (Eds.), Handbook of Materials Data, 2nd Edn., pp. 1077 – 1100, Springer Nature, Cham Switzerland 2018.
- U. W. Pohl, Metalorganic vapor phase epitaxy of diluted nitrides and arsenide quantum dots. In: G. Dhanaraj, K. Byrappa, V. Prasad, M. Dudley (Eds.), Handbook of Crystal Growth, pp. 1133 – 1152, Springer, Berlin, Germany 2010.
- U. W. Pohl, D. Bimberg, Semiconductor Disk Lasers based on Quantum Dots. In: O. G. Okhotnikov (Ed.), Semiconductor Disk Lasers, pp. 187 – 212, Wiley, Weinheim 2010.
- U. W. Pohl, InAs/GaAs quantum qots with multimodal size distribution. In: Z. M. Wang (Ed.), Self-assembled quantum dots, pp. 43 – 66, Springer, New York, 2008.
- U. W. Pohl, S. Rodt, A. Hoffmann, Optical properties of III-V quantum dots. In: D. Bimberg (Ed.), Semiconductor Nanostructures, pp. 269 – 299, Springer, Berlin 2008.
- U. W. Pohl, A. Strittmatter, Control of self-organized In(Ga)As/GaAs quantum dot growth. In: D. Bimberg (Ed.), Semiconductor Nanostructures, pp. 41 – 65, Springer, Berlin 2008.
