= Karl Wolfgang Boer =

Physicist, solar energy pioneer (1926–2018)

Karl W. Böer
- Karl Wolfgang Böer
- Born: March 23, 1926; Berlin, Germany
- Died: April 18, 2018 (aged 92); Naples, Florida, United States
- Education: Humboldt University of Berlin
- Known for: Solar energy pioneer
- Scientific career
- Fields: Physics, solar energy
- Workplaces: University of Delaware

Karl Wolfgang Böer (March 23, 1926 – April 18, 2018) was a solar energy pioneer and expert in the field of semiconductor physics.

== Biography ==
Born in Berlin, Germany, he earned a Ph.D. from Humboldt University, Berlin (Diploma, Physics, 1949; Doctorate, Physics and Solid State Physics, 1952, 1955).

Böer founded Physica Status Solidi and subsequently published its first issue in July 1961. Physica Status Solidi is a family of international peer-reviewed, scientific journals, publishing research on all aspects of solid state physics, and material science. It is owned and published by Wiley-VCH. Böer served as editor.

Böer also founded and became the director of the Section of Dielectric Breakdown of the German Academy of Science in Berlin.

With the construction of the Berlin Wall, Böer made a decision to emigrate to the United States. In 1962, he began as an associate professor the University of Delaware. He became professor of physics in 1965, professor of physics and engineering in 1972, and distinguished professor of physics and solar energy in 1993 at the University of Delaware.

Böer led the discovery of solar energy technologies by focusing his work on the efficiency of Copper(I) sulfide and cadmium sulfide (Cu_{2}S/CdS) used in thin film solar conversions.

In 1973, Böer built an experimental house called the Solar One, the first house to convert sunlight into energy.

He is credited with writing articles in over 300 publications, along with several books. His latest, released in 2010, is "The Life of the Solar Pioneer. In 2018, he eventually published the Reference Work "Semiconductor Physics“ with Udo W. Pohl. Böer also holds 28 patents in the area of solid state technology. His book, Survey of Semiconductor Physics (1993) has been called the most comprehensive treatment in the field written by a single author.

The University of Delaware awards a Karl W. Böer Solar Energy Medal of Merit every two years. The award recognizes those who have made a significant contribution to solar as well as honors Böer for his initial contributions to the solar industry.

== Awards ==
- 1965 American Physical Society, Fellow
- 1998 Medal of Distinction, University of Delaware
- 2000 American Solar Energy Society, Fellow
- 2001 Institute of Electric and Electronic Engineers
- 2012 American Solar Energy Society Lifetime Leadership Award

== See also ==
- Solar power in the United States
