= Polarized target =

The polarized targets are used as fixed targets in scattering experiments. In high energy physics they are used to study the nucleon spin structure of simple nucleons like protons, neutrons or deuterons. In deep inelastic scattering the hadron structure is probed with electrons, muons or neutrinos. Using a polarized high energy muon beam, for example, on a fixed target with polarized nucleons it is possible to probe the spin dependent part of the structure functions.

In the simple parton model the nucleon consists of quarks and gluons and their interaction is governed by quantum chromodynamics. An alternative method to the fixed targets is to use two colliding polarized beams. Several institutes and laboratories work in this field.

An international workshop on "Polarized Sources, Targets and Polarimetry" takes place every two years.

The nuclear spins in the solid targets are polarized with dynamic nuclear polarization method typically in 2.5 or 5 T magnetic field.

The magnetic field can be generated with a superconducting magnet filled with liquid helium. The more traditional iron magnets are not preferred due to their large mass and limited geometrical acceptance for the produced particles. The target polarization during the experiment is determined with the nuclear magnetic resonance method. The integrated enhanced NMR-signals are compared to the signals taken in superfluid helium-4 bath at well known calibration temperatures around 1 K, where the spin magnetization follows the Curie law and the nuclear polarization can be calculated from the temperature by using the Brillouin function. During the polarization build up a microwave generator is used to pump the paramagnetic centers in the target material close to the electron spin resonance frequency (about 70 GHz in 2.5 T field).

In the helium-3 gas targets optical pumping is used to polarize the nucleons.

In the frozen spin targets low temperatures are needed to preserve the polarization for long data taking periods (for the highest possible integrated luminosity) and to reach maximum nuclear polarization for the best figure of merit. Usually a dilution refrigerator with high cooling power is used to reach temperatures below 300 mK during the polarization build up and below 50 mK in frozen spin mode.

To preserve the paramagnetic centers in the target material it has to be kept all the time at cryogenic temperatures typically below 100 K. A horizontal dilution cryostat with the possibility to load directly the target material into the helium-3/4 mixing chamber from a liquid nitrogen bath is needed for this reason. While the beam should interact with the target material scattering from the target construction materials is not desired. This leads to an additional requirement of small material budget in terms of radiation length. Thin and low density construction materials are used for this reason in the region of the incoming beam and the scattering products.

The properties of a good polarized target material are high number of polarizable nucleons compared to the total amount of nucleons, high polarization degree, short polarization build up time, slow polarization loss rate in frozen spin mode, good resistance against radiation damage and easy handling of the target material. For the dynamic nuclear polarization the material has to be doped with free radicals. Two different ways are usual: chemical doping by mixing with free radicals and creation of F-centers by irradiation in an intensive electron beam. Commonly used target materials are butanol, ammonia, lithium hydrides and their deuterated counterparts. A very interesting material is hydrogen deuteride, because it has the maximal content of polarizable nucleons. High proton polarizations have been reached in a large naphthalene single crystal using optically excited triplet states of fully deuterated pentacene guest molecules. at temperatures around 100 K and magnetic field of 0.3 T. Hyperpolarized carbon-13 has been studied for medical imaging applications
