= Physics and Chemistry of Liquids =

- Discipline: Chemistry, physics
- Language: English
- Edited by: N. H. March, G. G. N. Angilella

Publication details
- History: 1968-present
- Publisher: Taylor & Francis
- Frequency: Bimonthly
- Impact factor: 0.603 (2011)

Standard abbreviations
- ISO 4: Phys. Chem. Liq.

Indexing
- CODEN: PCLQAC
- ISSN: 0031-9104 (print); 1029-0451 (web)
- OCLC no.: 50516984

Links
- Journal homepage

Physics and Chemistry of Liquids is a peer-reviewed scientific journal that publishes experimental and theoretical research articles focused on the science of the liquid state.

The editors-in-chief are N. H. March and G. G. N. Angilella. According to the Journal Citation Reports, the journal has a 2011 impact factor of 0.603.

== Scope ==
The journal's scope includes all types of liquids, from monatomic liquids and their mixtures, through charged liquids to molecular liquids.

== Abstracting and indexing ==
Physics and Chemistry of Liquids is abstracted and indexed in the following databases:

- GEOBASE
- Chemical Abstracts Service - CASSI
- PubMed - MEDLINE
- Science Citation Index - Web of Science
