= Pavel Jelínek =

Czech physicist

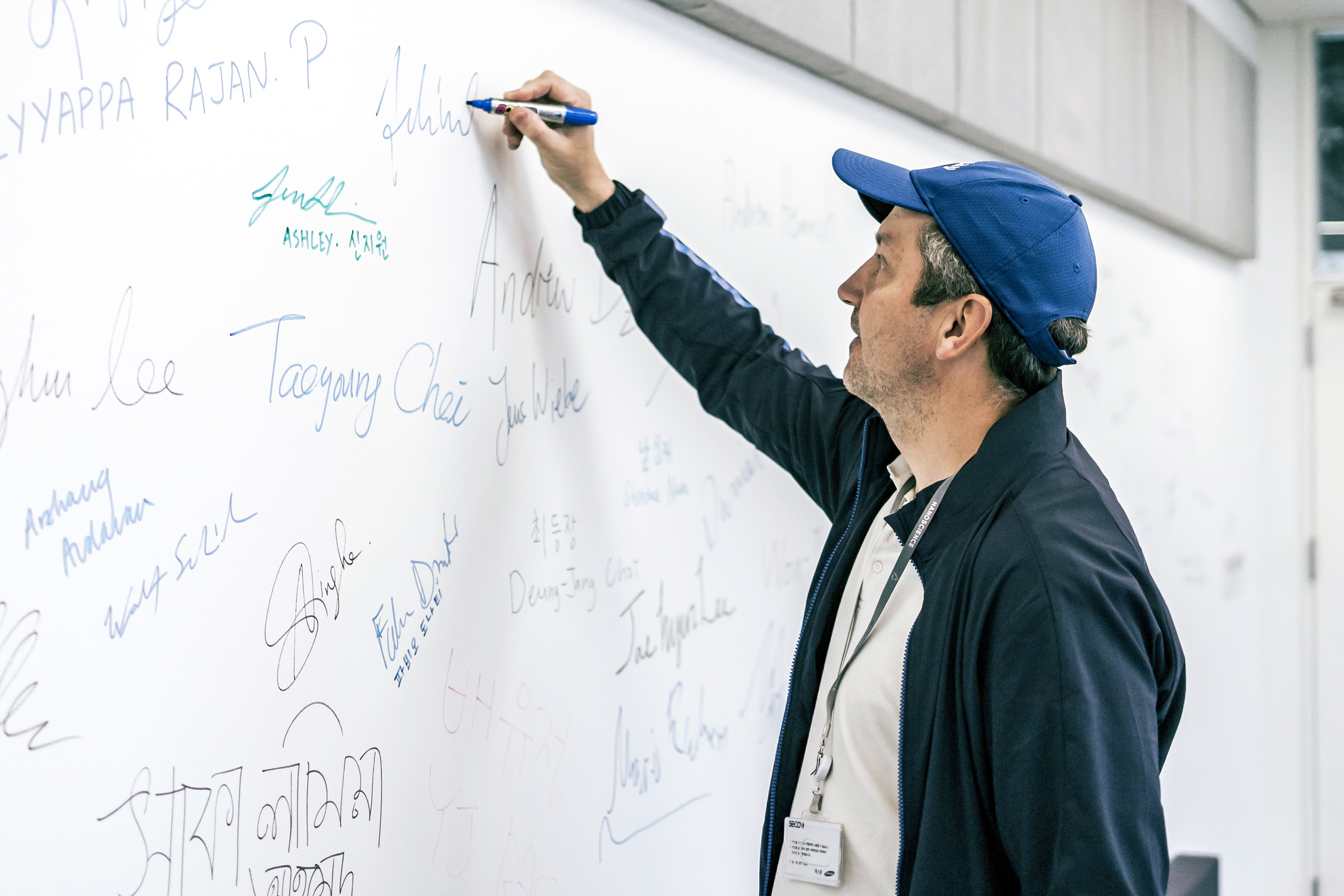
- Born: 17 November 1972; Prague, Czechoslovakia
- Known for: Chemically identified individual atoms using an atomic force microscope and quantum-mechanical computation

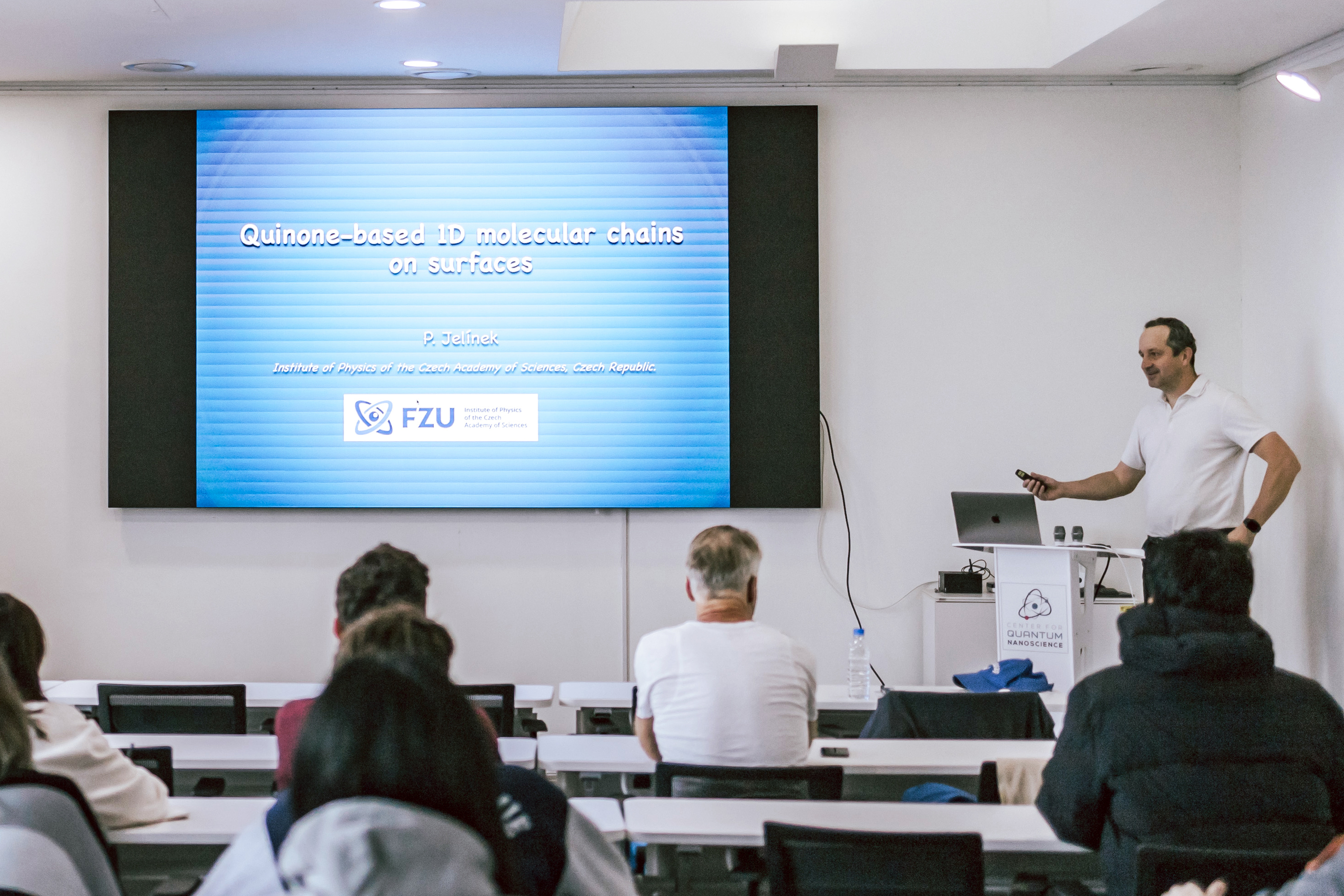
Pavel Jelínek giving a lecture in the Center for Quantum Nanoscience.

Pavel Jelínek (Czech pronunciation: [ˈpavɛl ˈjɛliːnɛk]; born 17 November 1972) is a Czech physicist. He is a member of an international group of scientists (from Japan, Spain and the Czech Republic) that for the first time chemically identified individual atoms using an atomic force microscope and quantum-mechanical computation. More specifically, they were able to image surface of an alloy at atomic resolution and successfully identify tin, lead and silicon atoms on this surface.
