= Purdue University Reactor Number One =

Research reactor in West Lafayette, Indiana, US

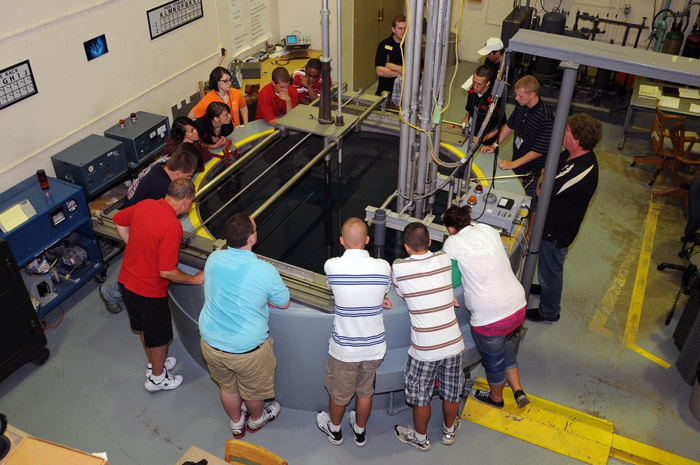
- The PUR-1 cooling pool

- Location within Indiana
- Operating institution: Purdue University
- Location: West Lafayette, Indiana, USA
- Coordinates: 40°25′42″N 86°54′41″W
- Type: Open pool reactor
- Power: 10 kW (thermal)

Construction and upkeep
- Construction cost: $125,000
- Construction began: 1961
- First criticality: August 30, 1962
- Annual upkeep cost: $7,000
- Staff: 3
- Operators: 3

Technical specifications
- Max thermal flux: 2.1×10^{10} n/cm^{2}·s
- Max fast flux: 1.2×10^{10} n/cm^{2}·s
- Fuel type: Flat plate MTR
- Cooling: Light water
- Neutron moderator: Light water
- Neutron reflector: Graphite
- Control rods: 3
- Cladding material: Aluminum alloy
- Source(s): "PUR-1 Purdue Univ". International Atomic Energy Agency. September 17, 1998.

The Purdue University Reactor Number One (PUR-1) is a research reactor in West Lafayette, Indiana, United States. It is used primarily for teaching purposes in Purdue University's School of Nuclear Engineering. Built in 1962, the PUR-1 is the only nuclear reactor operating in the US state of Indiana. It was the second reactor installed in Indiana, and was the first critical reactor, after a sub-critical reactor was installed at Valparaiso University in 1958.

== Design ==
In April 1961, Purdue University selected Lockheed Corporation to build its research reactor after twelve companies submitted bids. It was installed underground, three stories beneath the Duncan Annex of Purdue's Electrical Engineering Building. The reactor first achieved criticality on August 30, 1962, and a dedication ceremony was held on September 27 of that year. The construction cost was $125,000.

The PUR-1 was the second nuclear reactor and first critical reactor in Indiana. A third reactor was later installed at the planned Marble Hill Nuclear Power Plant in Jefferson County but was removed when construction of the plant halted in 1984. The reactor at Valparaiso University was dismantled in 2000. As a result, the PUR-1 is currently the only reactor in the state.

The Purdue reactor was among the first to be designed mainly for student use. It is licensed to produce up to one kilowatt of thermal power, comparable to the energy demand of a hair dryer or a toaster. This low power makes it safer and less expensive than reactors designed for research or electricity generation. The reactor's core is 2 cubic feet (0.057 m^{3}) in volume and sits at the bottom of a 17-foot-deep (5.2 m) cooling pool of water that measures 8 feet (2.4 m) in diameter. This allows the core to be safely viewed while it is operating.

== Use ==
The reactor's primary purpose is for training students in the principles of reactor physics. The university also uses it as a source for neutrons for research in nuclear engineering, health science, chemistry, pharmacy, agriculture, biology, and nanotechnology.

Purdue's reactor is also used for outreach. The School of Nuclear Engineering regularly gives tours of its facilities to local high school students and the general public. As of 2012, it was estimated that between 1,600 and 1,800 visitors see the reactor facilities annually.

== Safety ==
In 2005, journalism interns produced a report for ABC News about the possibility of terrorist attacks on research reactors in the United States. When they arrived at Purdue University, the interns were surprised at how easy it was for the general public to obtain a tour of the reactor facilities. They also noted a lack of background checks, guards, and metal detectors.

In response, the university said that the ABC report had misrepresented the nature of research reactors and that the interns were not qualified to make such safety evaluations. Unlike power plants, that produce electricity by running steam turbines, research reactors operate well below boiling conditions. Because of its low power range and its underground location, Purdue says that any attack on its reactor facilities would be unlikely to affect anything outside of that room. The way in which the reactor is installed means that theft of its fuel would require "a major construction project" that "could not be done covertly."

The PUR-1 originally used highly enriched, or "weapons-grade", uranium as fuel. In 1982, the government announced plans to convert civilian reactors to low-enriched uranium. Conversion of the Purdue reactor was completed in September 2007.

On February 16, 2021, the NRC issued a Notice of Violation to Purdue University involving two violations. The first violation involves the Purdue University Research Reactor operating at steady state power levels in excess of 12 kilowatts (thermal) on several occasions between October 31, 2019, and September 15, 2020, which was beyond allowed thermal power levels as limited in their Reactor License. Specifically, the reactor was inadvertently operated at power levels greater than 12 kW(t) during this time due to nuclear instrument (NI) calibration calculation errors that caused the NIs to indicate reactor power levels that were approximately three times lower than actual reactor power. Therefore, when the licensee operated the reactor above 4 kW(t) (indicated power) several times between October 31, 2019, and September 15, 2020, the actual reactor power exceeded the maximum authorized power level of 12 kW(t). The second violation involves Purdue University's failure to perform appropriate surveillance testing before considering the NI system operable following replacement of the NI system and detectors in 2019.

== See also ==
- Bailly Nuclear Power Plant, another planned reactor in northern Indiana
