= Pierson–Moskowitz spectrum =

Empirical relationship in oceanography

The Pierson–Moskowitz (PM) spectra is an empirical relationship that defines the distribution of energy with frequency within the ocean.

Developed in 1964 the PM spectrum is one of the simplest descriptions for the energy distribution. It assumes that if the wind blows steadily for a long time over a large area, then the waves will eventually reach a point of equilibrium with the wind. This is known as a fully developed sea. Pierson and Moskowitz developed their spectrum from measurements in the North Atlantic during 1964, and presented the following relationship between energy distribution and wind: The observations of Pierson and Moskowitz were carefully re-analyzed in a 2003 investigation, which confirmed some values and proposed new thresholds to the original observations.
