= Parachor =

Physical quantity related to surface tension

Parachor is a quantity related to surface tension that was proposed by S. Sugden in 1924. It is defined according to the formula:

$$P = \gamma^{1/4} M / (\rho_L - \rho_V)$$,

where $\gamma$ is the surface tension, $M$ is the molar mass, $\rho_L$ is the liquid density, and $\rho_V$ is the vapor density in equilibrium with liquid. Parachor has a volume multiplier and is therefore extensible from components to mixtures. Parachor "has been used in solving various structural problems."

The etymology of parachor is from a combination of prefix para "para," meaning "aside," and Greek "chor," meaning "space." Sugden in other publications showed that each compound had a characteristic parachor value. Since the work of Sugden, parachor has been used to "correlate" the surface tension data of a variety of pure liquids and liquid mixtures.

Boudh-Hir and Mansoori (1990) presented a general molecular theory for parachor valid for all ranges of temperature.

Using the molecular theory of Boudh-Hir and Mansoori, Escobedo and Mansoori (1996) produced an analytical solution for parachor, as a function of temperature valid in all temperatures ranging from melting point to critical point. They also used the resulting analytic equation to predict surface tensions of a variety of liquids in all ranges of temperature from melting point to critical point. It is shown to represent the experimental surface tension data of 94 different organic compounds within 1.05 AAD%. This analytic equation represents an accurate and generalized expression to predict surface tensions of pure liquids of practical interest.

Escobedo and Mansoori (1998), extended applications of the same theory to the case of mixtures of organic liquids. Using the proposed equation surface tensions of 55 binary mixtures are predicted within an overall 0.50 AAD% which is better than all the available prediction and correlation methods. When the resulting equations are made compound-insensitive using a corresponding states principle, the surface tension of all the same 55 binary mixtures are predicted within an overall 2.10 AAD%. It is shown that the proposed model is also applicable to multicomponent liquid mixtures.

== Surface Tension of Binary Mixtures ==
The surface tension of binary carbon dioxide mixtures was predicted using a modified parachor approach that took temperature-dependent characteristics into account.

Individual solvent parachors rise almost linearly with decreasing temperature. The exponent of the parachor equation drops consistently as the temperature is decreased for all binary mixtures.
