= Polymers for Advanced Technologies =

- Discipline: Chemistry
- Language: English
- Edited by: Abraham Domb

Publication details
- History: 1990-present
- Publisher: John Wiley & Sons
- Frequency: Monthly
- Impact factor: 3.1 (2023)

Standard abbreviations
- ISO 4: Polym. Adv. Technol.

Indexing
- CODEN: PADTE5
- ISSN: 1042-7147 (print); 1099-1581 (web)
- LCCN: 90650054
- OCLC no.: 41631635

Links
- Journal homepage; Online access; Online archive

Polymers for Advanced Technologies is a monthly peer-reviewed scientific journal, published since 1990 by John Wiley & Sons. It covers research on polymer science and technology.

== Abstracting and indexing ==
The journal is abstracted and indexed in Chemical Abstracts Service, Scopus, and the Science Citation Index Expanded. According to the Journal Citation Reports, its 2023 impact factor is 3.1.

== Most cited papers ==
The three most-cited papers are:

1. "Stepwise polyelectrolyte assembly on particle surfaces: a novel approach to colloid design", Volume 9, Issue 10–11, Oct-Nov 1998, Pages: 759–767, Sukhorukov GB, Donath E, Davis S, et al.
2. "Formation of crew-cut aggregates of various morphologies from amphiphilic block copolymers in solution", Volume 9, Issue 10–11, Oct-Nov 1998, Pages: 677–699, Zhang LF, Eisenberg A.
3. "Nanocomposite materials from latex and cellulose whiskers", Volume 6, Issue 5, May 1995, Pages: 351–355, Favier V, Canova GR, Cavaille JY, et al.
