= PEPS effect =

Phenomenon seen in semiconducting electrodes

The PEPS Effect (Photoelectochemical Photocurrent Switching) is a phenomenon seen in semiconducting electrodes. It is defined as switching of photocurrent polarity on changes in photoelectrode potential and/or incident light wavelength.

Konrad Szaciłowski and Wojciech Macyk were the first to describe it in their publication in 2006. The discovered phenomenon opens a wide variety of applications in construction of switches, logic gates and sensors based on chemical systems.

== Bibliography ==
1. S. Gawęda, A. Podborska, W. Macyk and K. Szaciowski, Nanoscale optoelectronic switches and logic devices, Nanoscale, 2009, 1, 299 doi:10.1039/b9nr00145j
