= Photomagneton =

Theoretical technique in quantum theory

The photomagneton is a theoretical treatment of the unitary group in quantum field theory and quantum chemistry that effectively describes the experimentally observed inverse Faraday effect. When circularly polarized light travels through a plasma, the angular momentum associated to the circular motion of the photons induces an angular momentum in the electrons of the plasma. This angular momentum induces an associated magnetic field.

Exactly how this happens remains a subject of debate. For instance, if the so-called ghost field does not contribute to the free electromagnetic energy density in the plasma, then the electron must couple to something like a complex electric field. However, if the field induces a finite magnetic field in the absence of matter, then the implication may be a finite photon rest mass.
