= Preferential concentration =

Preferential concentration of 50 micron hollow glass particles in the homogeneous isotropic turbulence without mean flow when the Stokes number is 1

Preferential concentration is the tendency of dense particles in a turbulent fluid to cluster in regions of high strain (low vorticity) due to their inertia. The extent by which particles cluster is determined by the Stokes number, defined as $Stk \equiv \frac{ \tau_p}{ \tau_f} = \frac{\rho_p d^2 \epsilon^{1/2}} { 18 \rho_f \nu^{3/2}}$, where $\tau_p$ and $\tau_f$ are the timescales for the particle and fluid respectively; note that $\rho_p$ and $\rho_f$ are the mass densities of the fluid and the particle, respectively, $\nu$ is the kinematic viscosity of the fluid, and $\epsilon$ is the kinetic energy dissipation rate of the turbulence. Maximum preferential concentration occurs at $Stk \sim 1$. Particles with $Stk \ll 1$ follow fluid streamlines and particles with $Stk \gg 1$ do not respond significantly to the fluid within the times the fluid motions are coherent.

Systems that can be strongly influenced by the dynamics of preferential concentration are aerosol production of fine powders, spray, emulsifier, and crystallization reactors, pneumatic devices, cloud droplet formation, aerosol transport in the upper atmosphere, and even planet formation from protoplanetary nebula.
