= PITZ =

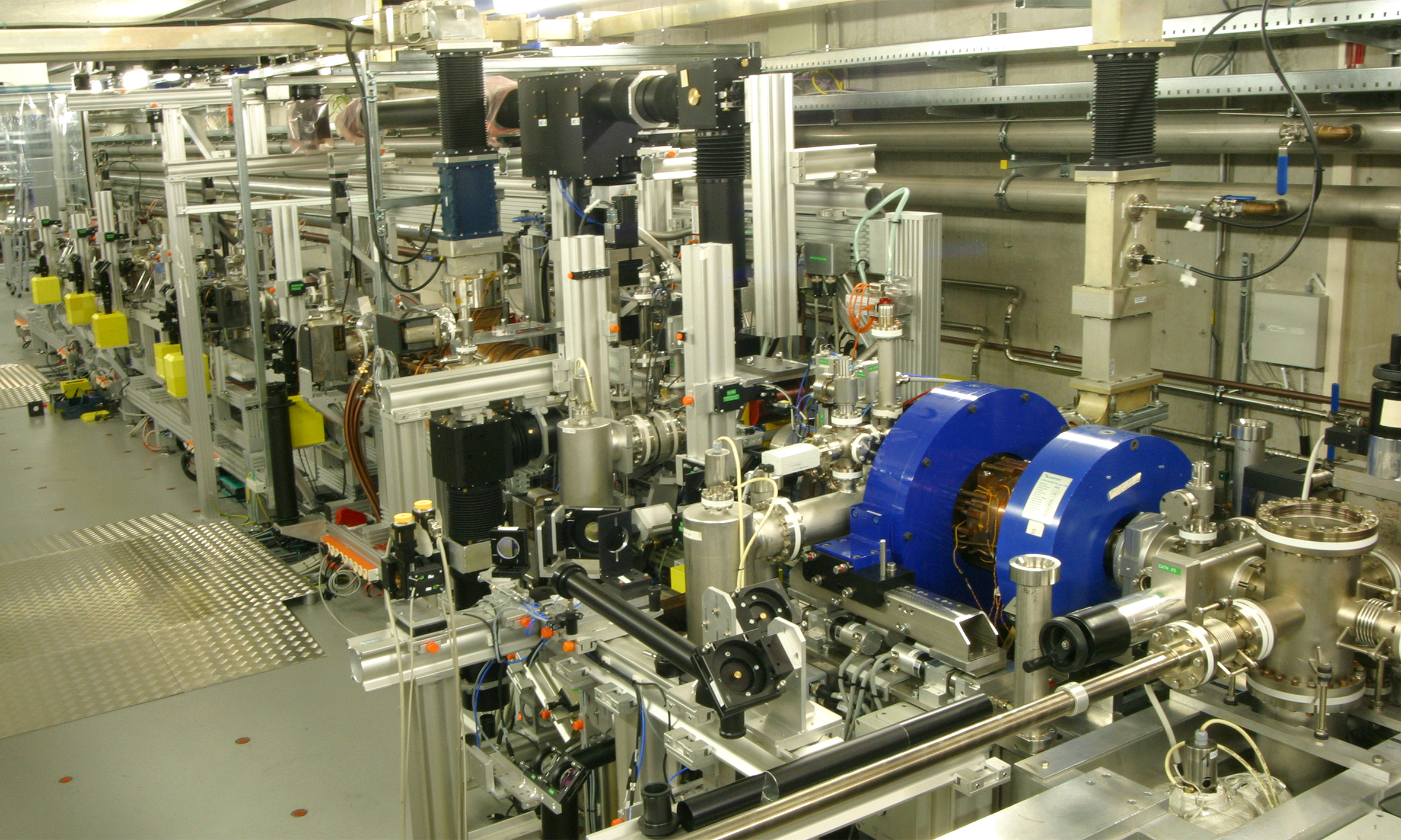
PITZ setup.

The Photo Injector Test Facility at the DESY location in Zeuthen (PITZ) was built in 2002 in order to test and optimize sources of high-brightness electron beams for future free-electron lasers (FELs) and linear colliders. The focus at PITZ is on the production of intense electron beams with very small transverse emittance and reasonably small longitudinal emittance which are required in order to meet the high-gain conditions of FEL operation. This challenge is met by applying the most advanced techniques in combination with key parameters of projects based on TESLA technology, such as FLASH and the European XFEL. The PITZ collaboration involves several accelerator centres and institutes from around the world.
