= Get the Picture =

Get the Picture may refer to:

- Get the Picture (game show), a children's game show
- Get the Picture? (Smash Mouth album), 2003
- Get the Picture? (The Pretty Things album), 1965
- Get the Picture: A Personal History of Photojournalism, a book by former picture editor John G. Morris
