= Per Arne Rikvold =

Norwegian physicist (born 1948)

Per Arne Rikvold (born 4 October 1948) is a Norwegian academic physicist specializing in materials science, condensed-matter physics and computational science.

He took the cand.real. degree at the University of Oslo in 1976 and the PhD at Temple University in 1983. He is James G. Skofronick Professor of Physics at Florida State University, where is affiliated with the Center for Materials Research and Technology (MARTECH), the School of Computational Science, and the National High Magnetic Field Laboratory.

He is an elected fellow of the Norwegian Academy of Science and Letters and of the American Physical Society.
