= Pasotron =

Microwave source

A Plasma-assisted slow-wave oscillator (Pasotron) is a directed energy device that produces high-power, long-pulse microwave energy. Because the device does not require any externally-produced magnetic fields to confine the electron beam used to generate the microwaves, it can be constructed to be smaller and lighter than other high-power microwave sources. In the early 1990s, pasotrons began to be considered as a possible directed energy weapon applicable to missile defense, radio jamming and other military uses.
