= Physica Status Solidi =

- Discipline: Solid state physics, material science
- Language: English

Publication details
- History: 1961–present
- Publisher: Wiley-VCH

Standard abbreviations
- ISO 4: Phys. Status Solidi

Indexing
- Phys. Status Solidi A
- ISSN: 1862-6300 (print); 1862-6319 (web)
- Phys. Status Solidi B
- ISSN: 0370-1972 (print); 1521-3951 (web)
- Phys. Status Solidi C
- ISSN: 1862-6351 (print); 1610-1642 (web)
- Phys. Status Solidi RRL
- ISSN: 1862-6254 (print); 1862-6270 (web)

Physica Status Solidi, often stylized physica status solidi or pss, is a family of international peer-reviewed, scientific journals, publishing research on all aspects of solid state physics, and materials science. It is owned and published by Wiley–VCH. These journals publish over 2000 articles per year, making it one of the largest international publications in condensed matter physics. The current editor in chief is Stefan Hildebrandt at the Editorial Office based in Berlin. This office also manages the peer-review process.

== History ==
Physica Status Solidi was founded by Karl Wolfgang Böer (then at Humboldt University of Berlin) in East Berlin and published its first issue in July 1961. Shortly after the journal was founded, the construction of the Berlin Wall in August 1961 exacerbated the distances between scientists from the Eastern and Western blocs. Throughout the Cold War Physica Status Solidi maintained political independence and English as publication language and, as such, it became a major platform for the scientists behind the Iron Curtain to disseminate their results in the Western world (and vice versa) and thus a forum of international exchange for scientists from the East and the West.

In 1970 the journal was divided into series A (Applications and Materials Science) and B (Basic Solid State Physics). In 2003, series C (Current Topics in Solid State Physics) was created to accommodate the publication of conference proceedings.

Following the reunification of Germany in 1990 the journal's original publisher Akademie Verlag became part of the VCH Publishing group, which again was merged into John Wiley & Sons, leading to the formation of Wiley-VCH Verlag in 1997.

A fourth series, RRL (Rapid Research Letters), was launched in 2007 to publish short articles of broader and immediate interest to the solid state physics and materials science community. Publication times are typically two weeks from submission to online publication.

== Journals ==
Journal	Abbreviation	Scope	Frequency (issues/year)	Publication History	Impact factor (2023)	Page
Physica Status Solidi	Phys. Status Solidi	Initial journal, predecessor of the later (b) series	varying	1961–1970		
Physica Status Solidi A – Applications and Materials Science	Phys. Status Solidi A	Preparation, structure and simulation of advanced materials, nanostructures, surfaces and interfaces, as well as properties of such materials and structures relevant for device applications (magnetic, electromechanical, or electronic devices, photonics, spintronics, sensors, etc.). It does not, however, publish materials engineering and electrical engineering topics.	12	1970–present	1.9	
Physica Status Solidi B – Basic Solid State Physics	Phys. Status Solidi B	Theoretical and experimental investigations of the atomistic and electronic structure of solids in general, phase transitions, electronic, optical, magnetic, superconducting, ferroelectric or other properties of solids, low-dimensional, nanoscale, strongly correlated or disordered systems etc.	12	1971–present	1.5	
Physica Status Solidi C – Current Topics in Solid State Physics	Phys. Status Solidi C	Conference Proceedings in the area of solid state physics and materials science.	12	2003–2017	Indexed in ISI Conference Proceedings Citation Index	
Physica Status Solidi – Rapid Research Letters	Phys. Status Solidi Rapid Res. Lett.	Rapid Research Letters on important findings with a high degree of novelty and need for express publication, as well as other results of immediate interest to the solid state physics and materials science community. Rapid Research Letters particularly invites papers from interdisciplinary and emerging new areas of research.	12	2007–present	2.5	
