= Progress in Physics =

- Discipline: Theoretical and experimental physics
- Language: English
- Edited by: Dmitri Rabounski

Publication details
- History: 2005–present
- Frequency: Quarterly
- License: CC BY-NC-ND 2.5

Standard abbreviations
- ISO 4: Prog. Phys.

Indexing
- ISSN: 1555-5534 (print); 1555-5615 (web)
- LCCN: 2005212250

Links
- Journal homepage

Progress in Physics is an open-access scientific journal, publishing papers in theoretical and experimental physics, including related themes from mathematics. The journal was founded by Dmitri Rabounski, Florentin Smarandache, and Larissa Borissova in 2005, and is published quarterly. Rabounski is the editor-in-chief, while Smarandache and Borissova act as associate editors. It was included on Beall's List of potentially-predatory journals at the time that list was last updated. Since 2008, the Norwegian Scientific Index has rated it a "Level 0" journal, indicating that publication there does not count for official academic career or public funding purposes.

== Aims and reviewing process ==
The journal aims to promote fair and non-commercialized science, as stated in its Declaration of Academic Freedom:

Owing to furtive jealousy and vested interest, modern science abhors open discussion and willfully banishes those scientists who question the orthodox views. Very often, scientists of outstanding ability, who point out deficiencies in current theory or interpretation of data, are labelled as crackpots, so that their views can be conveniently ignored.

The journal describes itself as peer-reviewed. The review procedure is specified as follows:

The journal promotes individual academic freedom and will consider all work without regard to affiliations. For this reason, the articles published in Progress in Physics may not necessarily represent the scientific views of the Editorial Board or its individual members. All submissions will be forwarded to invited experts, whose professional field is close to the submission. Decision about the submission will be produced by the Editors, according to the recommendations obtained from the side of the reviewers.

The referees of the papers published are not listed, although anonymity of referees is specifically criticized in "Article 8: Freedom to publish scientific results" of the Declaration of Academic Freedom. This document harshly criticizes the current peer-review system using the words "censorship", "alleged expert referees", "blacklisting", and "bribes". The journal has published papers by several authors, who, along with some of the editors, claim to have been blacklisted by the Cornell University arXiv, as proponents of fringe scientific theories.

== Indexing and abstracting ==
The journal is or has been indexed and abstracted in the following bibliographic databases:

- Communication Abstracts
- INSPEC
- MathSciNet, only up to 2012.
- Referativnyi Zhurnal
- zbMATH, only up to 2015.

It was indexed in the (paywalled) aggregator Open J-Gate and in the website Scientific Commons.
