= Physics of the Solid State =

- Discipline: Physics
- Language: English

Publication details
- Former name: Soviet Physics - Solid State
- Frequency: monthly
- Impact factor: 1.8 (2024)

Standard abbreviations
- ISO 4: Phys. Solid State

Indexing
- CODEN: PSOSED
- ISSN: 1063-7834 (print); 1090-6460 (web)
- OCLC no.: 35364153

Physics of the Solid State is a peer-reviewed scientific journal of solid state physics that publishes articles from researchers based at the Russian Academy of Sciences and other leading institutions in Russia. As of January 19, 2023, the intellectual property of this title is the subject of a dispute between several publishers.

== Abstracting and indexing ==
Physics of the Solid State is abstracted and indexed in the following databases:

- Academic OneFile
- Academic Search
- Astrophysics Data System
- Chemical Abstracts Service
- Chemical and Earth Sciences
- Current Abstracts
- Current Contents/Physical
- EBSCO
- Gale
- INIS Atomindex
- INSPEC
- International Bibliography of Book Reviews
- International Bibliography of Periodical Literature
- Journal Citation Reports/Science Edition
- SCImago
- Scopus
- Science Citation Index
- Science Citation Index Expanded (SciSearch)
- Summon by ProQuest

According to the publisher, the journal has an impact factor of 1.8.
