= Paul W. Chun =

American biochemist

Dr. Paul Chun
- Education: University of Missouri
- Known for: Thermodynamics of protein folding
- Scientific career
- Fields: Biochemistry
- Workplaces: University of Florida

Paul W. Chun is a professor emeritus at the University of Florida. He is a researcher in the field of protein folding equilibria, in particular, he is known as the "leading proponent" of using the Planck-Benzinger thermal work function to understand protein folding thermodynamics and stability. As such Chun has written a number of papers relating to the thermodynamics of protein folding. He received his Ph.D. in 1965 from the University of Missouri for work on the interaction of casein molecules, and joined the department of biochemistry and molecular biology at the University of Florida soon thereafter. He retired in 2003.

He has published 68 peer-reviewed papers listed in Scopus.
