= Photon-intermediate direct energy conversion =

Direct nuclear-to-electric power scheme

Photon-intermediate direct energy conversion (PIDEC) is a scheme for direct conversion of nuclear power to electricity.

PIDEC process is somewhat similar to a concept of fluorescent light - as in the CFL, in the nuclear reactor the original type of energy generated is not useful to humans. CFL uses a fluorescent coating on the inside of the light bulb to convert that energy into visible spectrum of the light. PIDEC uses fluorescer (in the form of gas) surrounding nuclear fuel acting as photon producer - fluorescer gets excited by neutron emissions and in turn emits narrow band ultraviolet light. That light is then relatively easily converted into electricity by special photo-voltaic converter.

Because the photons emitted by fluorescer are narrow band, the conversion efficiency is much higher than efficiency of common solar cells. The overall efficiency of PIDEC is expected to be around 40%. The remaining residual heat is still high enough to use it in traditional thermalized way via Carnot Cycle e.g. steam turbine. A combined efficiency of such conversion system (PIDEC + traditional) could reach as much as 70%. In comparison, due to limitations of using solid nuclear fuel and water as coolant, current generation of nuclear plants average only about 35% conversion efficiency.

PIDEC would work best with some IV Generation nuclear reactor designs. For instance in molten salt reactor low pressure liquid serves both as fuel and as coolant. This way reactor can safely operate at very high temperatures increasing the energy conversion efficiency.

A lot of theoretical work has been done at University of Missouri with some patents applied for by Mark A. Prelas. Professor Prelas is best known for advocating the concept of nuclear lightbulb.
