= Physica (journal) =

- Discipline: Physics
- Language: English

Publication details
- History: Physica: (1934–1974), Physica A: (1975–present); Physica B: (1975–present); Physica C: (1975–present); Physica D: (1980–present); Physica E: (1998–present)
- Publisher: Elsevier/North-Holland (Netherlands)
- Impact factor: Physica A: 3.1; Physica B: 2.8; Physica C: 1.0; Physica D: 2.9; Physica E: 2.9 (2024)

Standard abbreviations
- ISO 4: Physica

Indexing
- Physica A
- ISSN: 0378-4371
- Physica B
- ISSN: 0921-4526
- Physica C
- ISSN: 0921-4534
- Physica D
- ISSN: 0167-2789
- Physica E
- ISSN: 1386-9477

Physica is a Dutch series of peer-reviewed, scientific journals of physics by Elsevier. It started out in 1921 as a journal of the Nederlandse Natuurkundige Vereniging (Netherlands Physical Society) that published mostly in Dutch. In 1934 it was taken over by the North-Holland Publishing Company, keeping the same name but with a new volume numbering. The single journal Physica was split in a three-part series in 1975 (Physica A, Physica B, Physica C). Physica D was created in 1980, and Physica E in 1998. It was published in Utrecht until 2007, and is now published in Amsterdam by Elsevier.

== Physica A: Statistical Mechanics and its Applications ==
Physica A was created in 1975 as a result of the splitting of Physica in 1975. It is concerned with statistical mechanics and its applications, particularly random systems, fluids and soft condensed matter, dynamical processes, theoretical biology, econophysics, complex systems, and network theory.

Physica A is published by Elsevier on a bimonthly basis (24 times per year).

== Physica B: Condensed Matter ==
Physica B was created in 1975 as a result of the splitting of Physica in 1975. It is concerned with condensed matter physics and its applications, particularly solid state and low-temperature physics. Some conference proceedings are published in special editions of Physica B.

Physica B is published by Elsevier on an at-least monthly basis (12 times per year, sometimes more).

== Physica C: Superconductivity and its Applications ==
Physica C created in 1975 as a result of the splitting of Physica in 1975. It is a "rapid communications" type of journal, concerned with the topic superconductivity, superconducting materials, and related phenomena.

Physica C is published by Elsevier, two or three times per month.

== Physica D: Nonlinear Phenomena ==
Physica D was created in 1980 as an expansion of the Physica series. It is concerned with nonlinear physics and nonlinear phenomena in general.

Physica D is published by Elsevier on a bimonthly basis (24 times a year).

== Physica E: Low-dimensional Systems and Nanostructures ==
Physica E was created in 1998 as an expansion of the Physica series. It is concerned with nanostructures and thin films research, particularly the properties of quantum dots, quantum wells, quantum wires, and both bilayer and multilayer thin-film devices.

Physica E is published by Elsevier 10 times a year.
