= Prabhakar Misra =

American physicist

- Born: Lucknow, India
- Education: University of Calcutta (BSc); Carnegie Mellon University (MS); Ohio State University (PhD)
- Known for: Spectroscopy
- Scientific career
- Fields: Physics
- Workplaces: Howard University

Prabhakar Misra is an American physicist, who researches and teaches at Howard University in Washington, D.C., and is currently a professor in the Department of Physics and Astronomy.

== Biography ==
Born and raised in India, he came to the United States to pursue graduate studies in physics. He earned an M.S. in physics from Carnegie Mellon University in 1981 (Pittsburgh, Pennsylvania), followed by a Ph D. in Physics in 1986 from The Ohio State University (Columbus, Ohio). After a post-doctoral fellowship at the Laser Spectroscopy Facility of the Ohio State University, he joined Howard University in 1988. He was a visiting scholar in 1990 at Northwestern University in Evanston, Illinois.

== Research ==
Prabhakar Misra has been involved in basic and applied spectroscopic research that spans more than 25 years in the field of atomic and molecular physics and condensed matter physics. He has contributed extensively to the understanding of unstable and stable molecular species, which has included among others free radicals and ions that impact combustion and plasma processes. The utilization of the twin techniques of supersonic jet spectroscopy and optogalvanic spectroscopy has enabled the precise spectroscopic characterization of moderate-size organic species and the plasma associated with hollow cathode discharges. Besides the investigation of free radicals, neutral and ionic species in the ultraviolet and visible regions of the electromagnetic spectrum, Dr. Misra's research has also covered a detailed characterization and modeling of adsorption phenomena associated with trace atmospheric species on a variety of metallic and non-metallic surfaces in the mid-infrared region via Fourier Transform infrared spectroscopy and simulation of laser-tissue interactions using a liposome-dye complex. In addition, he has worked on the development of a database and spectral library of organic molecules that has relevance to the search for life on other planets, such as Mars. He is currently involved in the detailed characterization of a variety of nanomaterials (e.g. graphene, carbon nanotubes and metal oxides) using Raman Spectroscopy and Molecular Dynamics Simulations.

== Accomplishments ==
Prabhakar Misra is the editor of the book titled "Applied Spectroscopy and the Science of Nanomaterials" (New York: Springer, 2015). He is the co-editor (along with Chandran Haridas) of the research monograph "Fundamentals & Current Topics in Molecular Structure Research" (Research Signpost, 2011) and has also co-edited (along with Mark A. Dubinskii) the well-known book titled "Ultraviolet Spectroscopy and UV Lasers" (Marcel Dekker/CRC Press, 2002).

Misra is a recipient of the 2009 and 2010 DC Space Grant Consortium NASA Summer Faculty Fellowship award and spent the 2008 Summer on a NASA Astrobiology Institute MIRS & Exploration Systems Mission Directorate (ESMD) Fellowship at Goddard Space Flight Center in Greenbelt, Maryland. He has received a Certificate of Appreciation from the Alfred P. Sloan Foundation in 2008 for his commitment to advancing underrepresented minority students in STEM disciplines and his leadership in the foundation's Minority Ph.D. Program. During the Summers of 2007 and 2008, Misra was the recipient of a NASA ESMD Faculty Fellowship that enabled him to be stationed at Langley Research Center (2007), Virginia, and Goddard Space Flight Center (2007 & 2008), Maryland. Earlier in 2004–2005, Misra was a Fulbright Scholar and a visiting professor in the Department of Chemical Sciences at The Tata Institute of Fundamental Research (TIFR), Mumbai, India. He received the NASA Administrator's Fellowship Program (NAFP) award (1999–2001) (administered by the United States National Research Council, NRC), which enabled him to be involved with the Vegetation Canopy Lidar mission at NASA Goddard Space Flight Center (1999–2000) and to serve as a Study Coordinator for the National Academy of Sciences' sponsored study titled "Commercial Supersonic Technology- The Way Ahead" at the Aeronautics & Space Engineering Board (ASEB) (2000–2001). Misra participated in the Research Directors Conference that was held at the Massachusetts Institute of Technology (MIT) in April 2001 and over a period of two decades he has served on several important conference panels (both as a member of the program committee and as sessions chair) relating to spectroscopy and lasers. He has served as an Organizer and Keynote Speaker at the "Soft Matter" mini-symposium, which was part of The International Conference on Computational & Experimental Engineering and Sciences (ICCES 09), Phuket, Thailand, April 8–11, 2009. He was also an invited keynote speaker at the ICCES'12 meeting held in Crete, Greece, April 30-May 4, 2012. He has also served as a guest referee for the Journal of Geoscience Education, Journal of Chemical Engineering Communications, Journal of Computer Modeling, Journal of Lightwave Technology, Journal of Physical Chemistry, Journal of Propulsion and Power, Physica B, and the Journal of Quantitative Spectroscopy & Radiative Transfer. Dr. Misra has reviewed research proposals for the National Science Foundation (NSF), Agency for International Development (AID) and the National Institutes of Health (NIH). He is (or has been) a member of the Society of Photo-Optical Instrumentation Engineers (SPIE), American Association of University Professors (AAUP), Optical Society of America (OSA) and the New York Academy of Sciences (NYAS). He is also a fellow of the American Physical Society (APS) and the American Society for Laser Medicine & Surgery (ASLMS), Inc..

During the period 1992–2007, he served as a principal investigator (1992–96) and an associate principal investigator (1997–2007) for the Center for the Study of Terrestrial & Extraterrestrial Atmospheres (CSTEA), which was a NASA-funded University Research Center (URC). He has also contributed to education research by developing an Interdisciplinary Microcomputer-Based Teaching and Learning Platform for the Howard University Graduate School of Arts and Sciences and was showcased in the Center for Excellence in Teaching, Learning and Assessment (CETLA). In addition, he has developed Earth and Space Science Education curricula for the Earth System Science Education in the 21st Century (ESSE21) USRA program. He spearheaded the successful proposal to include Howard University as part of the USRA Consortium. He organized a Nobel Laureate Symposium on November 10, 2010, in which Dr. Douglas Osheroff, 1996 Nobel Laureate in Physics, was the invited speaker. A report of this event was written by the Society of Physics Students (SPS) National Organization. Dr. Misra organized a second Nobel Laureate Symposium featuring the 2001 Nobel Laureate in Physics, Dr. Eric A. Cornell, on February 22–23, 2012. He also organized a special event at Howard University on April 17, 2013, honoring Professor Sylvester James Gates, Jr., former chair of the Department of Physics & Astronomy at Howard University and a recipient of the 2011 National Medal of Science from President Barack Obama at a White House ceremony on February 1, 2013. At this event, Dr. George Robert Carruthers, former adjunct faculty member in the Department of Physics and Astronomy at Howard University, and a 2011 Awardee of the National Medal of Technology and Innovation, was also honored.

Misra and a Howard University Department of Physics & Astronomy student team successfully participated in a Zero-G Flight Experiment, Low Gravity Gas-Liquid Contactor, at Ellington Field, Houston, TX on November 12–13, 2013.

Misra serves as the advisor for the SPS Chapter at Howard University. He has advised and mentored 40 undergraduate students, graduate students and postdoctoral research associates who have been part of his research group.

== Honors and awards ==
- Outstanding Faculty Mentor Award, Office of Research, Howard University, Washington, DC, 2025
- Robert H. Goddard NASA Team Award for Excellence in Science, 2018.
- Elected Fellow of the American Physical Society (APS), 2015.
- Invited speaker and session chair, IC-EEE 2015 - International Conference on Energy Harvesting Storage and Conversion, February 4–7, 2015, Cochin University of Science and Technology, Cochin, India.
- Expert Judge, Toshiba/National Science Teachers Association (NSTA) ExploraVision Evaluation Panel, Regional Judges Meeting, February 23, 2014, Arlington, VA.
- Invited speaker and plenary session co-chair, 17th International Workshop on Physics of Semiconductor Devices (IWPSD 2013), December 10–13, 2013, Amity University, Noida, India.
- President, Howard University Chapter of Sigma Xi - The Scientific Research Society, 2013–14.
- Optoelectronics, Photonics & Applied Physics (OPAP) Annual International Conference Session Chair & Best Research Paper Awardee, Singapore, February 4–5, 2013.
- NASA URC Virtual Poster Session and Symposium Judge, October 24 – 31, 2012.
- NAP-MIRS 2012 Fellowship at NASA Goddard Space Flight Center, Greenbelt, MD, June–August 2012.
- NSF Graduate Research Fellowship Program Physics 1 and Astronomy Panelist, January 11–13, 2012, and January 13–16, 2015.
- Invited Lecturer and Nanotechnology Session Chair, XVI International Workshop on the Physics of Semiconductor Devices, IWPSD 2011, IIT Kanpur, India, December 19–22, 2011.
- Office of Naval Research (ONR) - American Society for Engineering Education (ASEE) Summer Faculty Research Program Review Panel, February 25, 2011, and February 24, 2012.
- National Defense Science and Engineering Graduate (NDSEG) Fellowship Panel, February 19, 2011.
- NASA Aeronautics Scholarship Program Evaluation Panel, February 18, 2011.
- 2011-13 Fulbright Specialist Program Peer Reviewer in Physics Education.
- 2010-14 Interim Chair, Department of Physics & Astronomy, Howard University.
- 2010 Optical Society of America Senior Member.
- Guest Editor, CMC: Computers, Materials & Continua, Vol.14, No.1, 2009.
- Designated Howard University Representative on the Universities Space Research Association (USRA) Council of Institutions (2009).
- NASA DC Space Grant Consortium Summer Fellowship (2009, 2010).
- Alfred P. Sloan Foundation Certificate of Appreciation (2008).
- NASA ESMD Fellowships (2007, 2008).
- NASA Astrobiology Institute Minority Institution Research Support (NAI-MIRS) Program Fellowship (2008).
- Fulbright Scholar Award (Dec 2004 - Aug 2005), J. William Fulbright Foreign Scholarship Board, Washington, D.C.
- NASA Administrator's Fellowship Program Award (July 1, 1999 – August 15, 2001), National Research Council, Washington, DC.
- Johnetta G. Davis Student Service Award (May 1998), Graduate School of Arts & Sciences, Howard University, Washington, DC.
- Professional Profile Cited in Marquis Who's Who in Science & Engineering (1992–93) and in Who's Who Among America's Teachers (1996, 2007).
- Researcher of the Month (April 1993), BIOS, Graduate School of Arts & Sciences, Howard University, Washington, DC.
