= Pressure-correction method =

Method for solving the Navier-Stokes equations

Pressure-correction method is a class of methods used in computational fluid dynamics for numerically solving the Navier-Stokes equations normally for incompressible flows.

== Common properties ==
The equations solved in this approach arise from the implicit time integration of the incompressible Navier–Stokes equations.

$\overbrace{\rho \Big( \underbrace{\frac{\partial \mathbf{v}}{\partial t}}_{ \begin{smallmatrix} \text{Unsteady}\\ \text{acceleration} \end{smallmatrix}} + \underbrace{\left(\mathbf{v} \cdot \nabla\right) \mathbf{v}}_{ \begin{smallmatrix} \text{Convective} \\ \text{acceleration} \end{smallmatrix}}\Big)}^{\text{Inertia}} = \underbrace{-\nabla p}_{ \begin{smallmatrix} \text{Pressure} \\ \text{gradient} \end{smallmatrix}} + \underbrace{\mu \nabla^2 \mathbf{v}}_{\text{Viscosity}} + \underbrace{\mathbf{f}}_{ \begin{smallmatrix} \text{Other} \\ \text{forces} \end{smallmatrix}}$

Due to the non-linearity of the convective term in the momentum equation that is written above, this problem is solved with a nested-loop approach. While so called global or inner iterations represent the real time-steps and are used to update the variables $\mathbf{v}$ and $p$, based on a linearized system, and boundary conditions; there is also an outer loop for updating the coefficients of the linearized system.
The outer iterations comprise two steps:

1. Solve the momentum equation for a provisional velocity based on the velocity and pressure of the previous outer loop.
2. Plug the new newly obtained velocity into the continuity equation to obtain a correction.

The correction for the velocity that is obtained from the second equation one has with incompressible flow, the non-divergence criterion or continuity equation

$$\nabla\cdot\mathbf{v} = 0$$

is computed by first calculating a residual value $\dot{m}$, resulting from spurious mass flux, then using this mass imbalance to get a new pressure value. The pressure value that is attempted to compute, is such that when plugged into momentum equations a divergence-free velocity field results. The mass imbalance is often also used for control of the outer loop.
The name of this class of methods stems from the fact that the correction of the velocity field is computed through the pressure-field.

The discretization of this is typically done with either the finite element method or the finite volume method. With the latter, one might also encounter the dual mesh, i.e. the computation grid obtained from connecting the centers of the cells that the initial subdivision into finite elements of the computation domain yielded.

== Implicit split-update procedures ==
Another approach which is typically used in FEM is the following.

The aim of the correction step is to ensure conservation of mass. In continuous form for compressible substances mass, conservation of mass is expressed by

$$\nabla\cdot\left(\rho(\mathbf{x})\mathbf{v}(\mathbf{x})\right) = \frac{\frac{d}{dt}p(\mathbf{x})}{c^2}$$

where $c^2$ is the square of the "speed of sound". For low Mach numbers and incompressible media $c$ is assumed to be infinite, which is the reason for the above continuity equation to reduce to

$$\begin{align}
\nabla\cdot\mathbf{v} &= 0
\end{align}$$

The way of obtaining a velocity field satisfying the above, is to compute a pressure which when substituted into the momentum equation leads to the desired correction of a preliminary computed intermediate velocity.

Applying the divergence operator to the compressible momentum equation yields

$$\begin{align}
\nabla\cdot\partial_t \mathbf{v} &= -\nabla\cdot(\mathbf{v}\cdot\nabla)\mathbf{v} + \nabla\cdot\nabla^2\mathbf{v} - \nabla^2 p\\
\partial_t \nabla\cdot\mathbf{v} &= -\nabla\cdot(\mathbf{v}\cdot\nabla)\mathbf{v} + \nabla^2\nabla\cdot\mathbf{v} - \nabla^2 p\\
0 &= -\nabla\cdot(\mathbf{v}\cdot\nabla)\mathbf{v} - \nabla^2 p\\
\nabla^2 p &= -\nabla\cdot(\mathbf{v}\cdot\nabla)\mathbf{v} & (\ast)
\end{align}$$

$(\ast)$ then provides the governing equation for pressure computation.

The idea of pressure-correction also exists in the case of variable density and high Mach numbers, although in this case there is a real physical meaning behind the coupling of dynamic pressure and velocity as arising from the continuity equation

$$\begin{align}
\partial_t \rho &= \nabla\cdot(\rho \mathbf{v})\\
\partial_t \rho &= \frac{1}{c^2}\partial_t p
\end{align}$$

$p$ is with compressibility, still an additional variable that can be eliminated with algebraic operations, but its variability is not a pure artifice as in the compressible case, and the methods for its computation differ significantly from those with $\rho = \text{constant}.$
