= Peter Thejll =

Danish astrophysicist and climate researcher

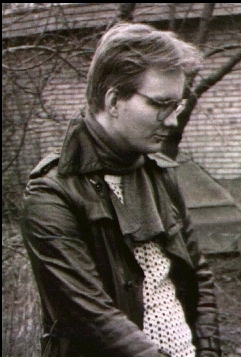
Peter Thejll

Peter Andreas Thejll (born 1956) is a Danish astrophysicist and climate researcher. His research in solar variation helped provide evidence of the greenhouse effect on the Earth's climate in the late 20th century. In particular, his study with Knud Lassen on Northern Hemisphere land air temperature showed that the rise of 0.4 degrees Celsius since 1980 could not be accounted for by the solar cycle, solely. Climatologists have pointed to this finding as a " piece of evidence for greenhouse warming".

Thejll received his undergraduate education at the University of Copenhagen. He received an M.S. in physics and a Ph.D. in astrophysics from the University of Delaware.

Thejll was a Carlsberg Fellow at the Niels Bohr Institute and worked at the Nordic Institute for Theoretical Physics. Thejll currently is a senior scientist at the Danish Meteorological Institute in Copenhagen. He is currently involved in the creation of a global automatic system to observe the Earth's reflectivity – albedo – using observations of the earthshine on the Moon. Such data can be used for climate change studies and calibration of satellite data as the measurements deliver independent data on the albedo. A telescope is now installed on Hawaii at the Mauna Loa Observatory. The Swedish research agency VINNOVA is funding this project.
