= Photonics Society of Poland =

Photonics Society of Poland (Polish: Polskie Stowarzyszenie Fotoniczne, PSP) is the largest optics/optoelectronics/photonics organization in Poland. It was transformed from the SPIE Poland Chapter on October 18, 2007 during the Extraordinary General Meeting of the SPIE Poland Chapter members.

PSP is a publisher of Photonics Letters of Poland.

== Photonics Letters of Poland ==
Photonics Letters of Poland
- Discipline: optical science
- Language: English
- Edited by: Ryszard S. Romaniuk

Publication details
- History: -present
- Publisher: Photonics Society of Poland (Poland)
- Open access: yes

Standard abbreviations
- ISO 4: Photonics Lett. Pol.

Indexing
- ISSN: 2080-2242

Links
- Journal homepage; current issue

Photonics Letters of Poland is a peer-reviewed scientific journal published by the Photonics Society of Poland in cooperation with SPIE four times a year. Founded in 2009. The journal has the following divisions of editorial scope: optical technology; information processing; lasers, photonics; environmental optics; and biomedical optics.

== See also ==
- European Photonics Industry Consortium
