= Polymeric liquid crystal =

Polymeric liquid crystals are similar to monomeric liquid crystals used in displays. Both have dielectric anitroscopy, or the ability to change directions and absorb or transmit light depending on electric fields. Polymeric liquid crystals form long head-to-tail or side chain polymers, which are woven in thick mats and therefore have high viscosities. The high viscosities allow the polymeric liquid crystals to be used in complex structures, but they are harder to align, limiting their usefulness. The polymerics align in microdomains facing all different directions, which ruins the optical effect. One solution to this is to mix in a small amount of photo-curing polymer, which when spin-coated onto a surface can be hardened. Basically, the polymeric liquid crystal and photocurer are aligned in one direction, and then the photo curer is cured, "freezing" the polymeric in one direction.
