= Peter Stilbs =

Peter Stilbs (born 1 June 1945) is an emeritus professor in physical chemistry at the Royal Institute of Technology (KTH) in Stockholm, Sweden.

Stilbs earned a master's degree in chemical engineering from the Lund Institute of Technology at Lund University in 1969, and a Ph.D. in physical chemistry in 1974. He served as a research assistant in physical chemistry at Uppsala University from 1976 to 1982, and as an assistant professor from 1982 to 1986. In 1986 he became full professor in physical chemistry at the Royal Institute of Technology in Stockholm. His main fields of research are the techniques and applications of nuclear magnetic resonance (NMR), in particular using pulsed-gradient spin-echo methodology for studying molecular self-diffusion and electrophoretic movement. The work (almost 200 peer-reviewed papers) has been summarised in a 1987 review article "Fourier Transform Pulsed-Gradient Spin-Echo Studies of Molecular Diffusion" (which has almost 2000 citations to date) and a more recent monograph "Diffusion and Electrophoretic NMR", which was published in 2019.

Stilbs has also been active in the debate on global warming. He has criticised the view that there is a scientific consensus on the attribution of recent climate change, and described the climate projections conducted by the Intergovernmental Panel on Climate Change (IPCC) as inadequate and misleading. In September 2006 he was chairman of an international seminar at the Royal Institute of Technology labelled Global Warming – Scientific Controversies in Climate Variability, where both critics and supporters of the theory of man-made global warming were invited. The concluding discussion sessions of that meeting have later been uploaded to YouTube, in two 45 min parts; and.
