= Pierre Bertholon de Saint-Lazare =

French physicist

- Born: 21 October 1741
- Died: 21 April 1800 (aged 58)
- Known for: electricity
- Scientific career
- Fields: physicist

Pierre Bertholon de Saint-Lazare (21 October 1741 – 21 April 1800) was a French physicist and a member of the Society of Sciences of Montpellier. He was known for his experiments with electricity.

== Publications ==
- De l’électricité des végétaux (1783) "The electrification of vegetables"
- De l’électricité du corps humain dans l’état de santé et de maladie (1786) "The electricity of the human body in the state of health and disease"
- De l’électricité des météores (1787) "The electricity of the meteors"
