= Photo-Carnot engine =

A photo-Carnot engine is a Carnot cycle engine in which the working medium is a photon inside a cavity with perfectly reflecting walls. Radiation is the working fluid, and the piston is driven by radiation pressure.

A quantum Carnot engine is one in which the atoms in the heat bath are given a small bit of quantum coherence. The phase of the atomic coherence provides a new control parameter.

The deep physics behind the second law of thermodynamics is not violated; nevertheless, the quantum Carnot engine has certain features that are not possible in a classical engine.

== Derivation ==
The internal energy of the photo-Carnot engine is proportional to the volume (unlike the ideal-gas equivalent) as well as the 4th power of the temperature (see Stefan–Boltzmann law) using $a = \frac {4\sigma}{c}$ :

$$U = V\varepsilon aT^{4} \,.$$

The radiation pressure is only proportional to this 4th power of temperature but no other variables, meaning that for this photo-Carnot engine an isotherm is equivalent to an isobar:

$$P = \frac{U}{3V} = \frac{\varepsilon aT^{4}}{3} \,.$$

Using the first law of thermodynamics ($dU = dW + dQ$) we can determine the work done through an adiabatic ($dQ = 0$) expansion by using the chain rule ($dU = \varepsilon aT^{4} dV + 4\varepsilon aVT^{3} dT$) and setting it equal to $dW_V = -PdV = -\frac{1}{3} \varepsilon aT^{4} dV \,.$

Combining these $dW_V = dU$ gives us $-\frac{1}{3} T dV = V dT$ which we can solve to find $T^{3} V= \text{const} \,$, or equivalently $PV^{4/3}=\text{const}\,.$

Since the photo-Carnot engine needs a quantum coherence in the gas which is lost during the process, the rebuild of coherency takes more energy than is produced with the machine.

The efficiency of this reversible engine including the coherency must at most be the Carnot efficiency, regardless of the mechanism and so $\eta \le \frac{T_H - T_C}{T_H} =1-\frac{T_C}{T_H}\,.$

== See also ==
- Carnot heat engine
- Radiometer
