= Photonics and Nanostructures: Fundamentals and Applications =

Journal

- Discipline: Photonics
- Language: English
- Edited by: A. Di Falco

Publication details
- History: 2003-present
- Publisher: Elsevier
- Frequency: Quarterly
- Impact factor: 2.9 (2024)

Standard abbreviations
- ISO 4: Photonics Nanostructures: Fundam. Appl.

Indexing
- ISSN: 1569-4410
- OCLC no.: 53915156

Links
- Journal homepage; Online access

Photonics and Nanostructures: Fundamentals and Applications is a peer-reviewed scientific journal, published quarterly by Elsevier. The editors-in-chief is A. Di Falco (University of St Andrews).

== Scope ==
This journal covers research in experiment, theory, and applications of photonic crystals and photonic band gaps. Additionally, the journal focuses on topics concerning the development of faster telecommunications and the transition from computer-electronics to computer-photonics. Coverage also includes the general topic of fabrication of photonic crystal structures and devices. Devices at the micro and nano levels are also included. At this size, these are optical waveguides, switches, lasers, components of photonic (optical) integrated circuits, photonic crystal integrated circuits, micro-optical-electro-mechanical-systems (MOEMS), photonic (optical) micro-cavities, and photonic "dots".

== Abstracting and indexing ==
This journal is abstracted and indexed in:

- AATA Online: Abstracts of International Conservation Literature
- Astrophysics Data System
- Current Contents/Physical, Chemical & Earth Sciences
- Current Contents/Chemistry & Earth Science
- EI-Compendex
- Inspec
- Materials Science Citation Index
- Science Citation Index Expanded
- Scopus

According to the Journal Citation Reports, the journal has a 2024 impact factor of 2.9.
