= Perfectly Reasonable Deviations from the Beaten Track =

Collection of letters by Richard Feynman

- First edition cover
- Editor: Michelle Feynman
- Author: Richard P. Feynman
- Language: English
- Genre: Anthology
- Publisher: Basic Books
- Publication date: 5 April 2005
- Publication place: United States
- Media type: Print
- Pages: 486 pp.
- ISBN: 978-0738206363

Perfectly Reasonable Deviations from the Beaten Track: The Letters of Richard P. Feynman is a collection of Nobel Prize winner Richard Feynman's letters.

The book was edited by his daughter, Michelle Feynman, and includes a foreword by Timothy Ferris. The book is also titled Don't You Have Time to Think?
