= Polymer Bulletin =

- Discipline: Chemistry
- Language: English
- Edited by: J. Gutmann, D. Sohn, N. Matsumi

Publication details
- History: 1978-present
- Publisher: Springer (Germany)
- Frequency: Monthly
- Impact factor: 2.870 (2020)

Standard abbreviations
- ISO 4: Polym. Bull.

Indexing
- ISSN: 0170-0839 (print); 1436-2449 (web)

Links
- Journal homepage

Polymer Bulletin is a peer-reviewed scientific journal published by Springer Science+Business Media, covering polymer science, including chemistry, physics, physical chemistry, and material science.

== Impact factor ==
Polymer Bulletin had a 2020 impact factor of 2.870.

== Editors ==
The Editors of the journal are Jochen Gutmann, Noriyoshi Matsumi, and Daewon Sohn. Klaus Müllen is the Honorary Editor of the journal. Associate Editors are Günther Auernhammer, Patrick Burch, Youssef Habibi and Gilberto Siqueira.
