= Philip J. Morrison =

American physicist

Philip J. Morrison is an American professor in physics at the Institute for Fusion Studies at the University of Texas.

He attended the University of California, San Diego, receiving a B.S. in 1972, M.S. in 1974. He received his Ph.D. under the supervision of Prof. William Thompson at the University of California, San Diego in 1979.

His interests are in fluid physics, plasma physics and mathematical physics, including basic nonlinear plasma dynamics, Hamiltonian dynamics of both finite- and infinite-degree-of-freedom systems, and fluid mechanics. He discovered several brackets, including those for magnetohydrodynamics and the Vlasov-Maxwell equations.

He is a fellow of the American Physical Society.

He is married to Laura Morrison, who has served on the Austin, TX city council.
