= Picture (string theory) =

In superstring theory, a picture is a choice of Fock space or, equivalently, a choice of ground state that defines a representation of the theory's state space. Each picture is denoted by a number, such as the 0 picture or −1 picture, and picture-changing operators transform from one representation to another. The use of these operators in BRST quantization is credited to Daniel Friedan, Emil Martinec, and Stephen Shenker in the 1980s, though it has a predecessor in the dual models of the early 1970s.

The difference between the ground states is indicated by the action of the superghost oscillators on them, and the number of the picture (plus 1/2) reflects the highest superghost oscillator which does not annihilate the ground state.
