= Inverse Faraday effect =

Magnetization by polarized light

The Faraday effect causes the index of refractions for right and left circular polarization to be different when light is propagating along either the magnetic field or the magnetization. The inverse Faraday effect (IFE) is the effect opposite to the Faraday effect. A static magnetization $\mathbf{M}(0)$ is induced by circularly polarized light. One reason for the name IFE is that the amplitude of the magnetization is proportional to the same Verdet constant that governs the Faraday effect. The induced magnetization of the IFE is proportional to the product of the Verdet coefficient and vector product of $\mathbf{E}$ and $\mathbf{E}^*$:

$$\mathbf{M}(0)\propto[\mathbf{E}(\omega)\times\mathbf{E}^*(\omega)]$$

With the proper use of the complex form for the electric fields this equation shows that circularly polarized light with the frequency $\omega$ should induce a static magnetization along the wave vector $\mathbf{k}$. The vector product of left- and right-handed polarization waves should induce magnetization of opposite signs.

The pulsed laser developed by Theodore Maiman in 1960 facilitated the entire field of non-linear optics for which Nicolaas Bloembergen was awarded the Nobel prize in 1981, and which enabled the first experimental confirmation of the Inverse Faraday Experiment by Pershan and students in 1965.
