= Pyotr Trusov =

Russian physicist (born 1948)

Pyotr Valentinovich Trusov (Russian: Пётр Валентинович Трусов; born May 7, 1948) is a Russian physicist whose main contributions are in the field of continuum mechanics.

== Life and work ==
Pyotr Valentinovich Trusov was born in Lviv, Ukraine. In 1972 he graduated from Perm State Technical University (PSTU). On February 14, 1978 he defended dissertation for a Candidate of Science degree. On February 27, 1987, in Moscow State University, he defended dissertation for a degree of Doctor of Physical and Mathematical Sciences.

From 1988 to 1993 Trusov was dean of Faculty of Applied Mathematics and Mechanics, Perm State Technical University. Since 1989 he was professor on Chair of Mathematical Modeling of Systems and Processes. Since 1992 he is head of chair.

Pyotr Valentinovich Trusov was awarded by title of Honoured Scientist of Russian Federation. He is a corresponding member of Russian Academy of Natural Sciences.

== Scientific interests ==
The main field of scientific interests of Pyotr Valentinovich Trusov is the mathematical modeling of mechanics of big elasto-plastic deformations, residual stress, micro- and mesomechanics of metals, crystallization of metals and alloys, mechanics of plastic processing of metals.

The subjects of his scientific works are :

- “The research on the defining relations of inelastic deformation of metals, alloys, ceramic materials on macro- end mesolevel for complex load and big deformations. Building models of plastic working processes for mentioned material classes.”
- “Building models for crystallization of metals and alloys on different (micro-, meso- and macro-) scale levels, modeling of technological processes of casting.”

On the research results 2 monographs, 14 methodical manuals and more than 110 papers were published.

== Educational work ==
Pyotr Valentinovich Trusov shows teaching activity in PSTU on following branches:

- classical mechanics;
- tensor analysis;
- continuum mechanics;
- theory of plasticity;
- theory of defining relations.

== Public activity ==
In 1972—1974 and 1978—1987 Trusov was member of Students Research Efforts Council of PSTU. Since 1987 he was the chairman of YSTW (Youths' Scientific and Technical Works) Council of PSTU, and the prorector on YSTW.

Since 1996 he is the chairman of Advisory Council of ESC (Education and Science Committee of Perm City Administration) and the member of Coordinating Council of ESC on the interaction with gifted children.

He repeatedly was the chairman of the Organizing Committee of All-Russia Conference of Young Scientists and Students “Mathematical modeling in natural sciences”. This conference was first organized by MMSP Chair in 1993 and was subsequently conducted yearly.

In 2001 Trusov was elected to Russian National Committee on the Theoretical and Applied Mechanics. He took part in the VIII All-Russia Congress on Theoretical and Applied Mechanics.

== Awards ==
On December 18, 2002 together with group of Perm scientists Trusov was awarded with 2002 prize of President of Russian Federation in the field of education for research and development project “Theory and practice of specialist training in the science intensive directions in the ‘school and college’ system" .

On February 8, 2005 for the series of works on subject “Nonlinear models of crystallization and deformation of polycrystals, meso- and macrolevel” Trusov was awarded with first degree Alexandr Pozdeyev Award.

== Published works ==
=== Books ===
1. (in Russian) А. А. Поздеев, Ю. И. Няшин, П. В. Трусов. Остаточные напряжения: теория и приложения. — М.: Наука, 1982. 112 с.
2. (in Russian) А. А. Поздеев, П. В. Трусов, Ю. И. Няшин. Большие упругопластические деформации: теория, алгоритмы, приложения. — М: Наука, 1986. 232 с.
3. (in Russian) П. В. Трусов, Ю. И. Няшин. Введение в нелинейную механику. Ч. 1. Необходимые сведения из тензорного исчисления. — Пермь: Перм. гос. ун-т, 1992, 104 с.
4. (in Russian) П. В. Трусов, О. И. Дударь, В. Д. Онискив. Механика сплошной среды. Ч. 1: Кинематика. — Пермь: ПГТУ, 1994, 88 c.
5. (in Russian) П. В. Трусов, О. И. Дударь. Механика сплошной среды. Ч. 2: Динамика сплошной среды. — Пермь: ПГТУ, 1995, 72 c.
6. (in Russian) П. В. Трусов. Механика сплошной среды. Ч. 3: Классические среды. — Пермь: ПГТУ, 1996, 142 c.
7. (in Russian) П. В. Трусов, И. Э. Келлер. Теория определяющих соотношений. Ч. I. Общая теория. Учебное пособие для студентов вузов специальности «Прикладная математика», рекомендованное учебно-методическим отделом по электронике и прикладной математике Минобразования РФ. — Пермь: ПГТУ, 1997. 98 с.
8. (in Russian) П. В. Трусов, И. Э. Келлер. Теория определяющих соотношений. Ч. II. Некоторые современные теории пластичности. — Пермь: ПГТУ, 1999.
9. (in Russian) П. В. Трусов, О. И. Дударь, И. Э. Келлер. Тензорные алгебра и анализ. Учебное пособие для студентов вузов специальности «Прикладная математика», рекомендованное учебно-методическим отделом по электронике и прикладной математике Минобразования РФ. — Пермь: РИО ПГТУ, 1998. 131 с.
10. (in Russian) Введение в математическое моделирование. Учебное пособие. Под ред. П. В. Трусова. — М.: Интермет Инжиниринг, 2000. 336 с.
11. (in Russian) Введение в математическое моделирование. Учебное пособие. Под ред. П. В. Трусова. — М.: Логос, 2004. 440 с. Тираж: 1500. ISBN 5-94010-272-7.

=== Papers ===
See full list of published works.
