= Physics Reports =

- Discipline: Physics
- Language: English
- Edited by: M. Kamionkowski

Publication details
- History: 1971–present
- Publisher: Elsevier
- Frequency: 48/year
- Impact factor: 27.5 (2025)

Standard abbreviations
- ISO 4: Phys. Rep.

Indexing
- ISSN: 0370-1573
- OCLC no.: 252468919

Links
- Journal homepage; Online access

Physics Reports is a peer-reviewed scientific journal, a review section of Physics Letters that has been published by Elsevier since 1971. The journal publishes long and deep reviews on all aspects of physics. In average, the length of these reports is the same of a short book. These reports aim to make their main points intelligible to non-specialists.
