= Photoinduced phase transitions =

Photoinduced phase transition is a technique used in solid-state physics. It is a process to the nonequilibrium phases generated from an equilibrium by shining on high energy photons, and the nonequilibrium phase is a macroscopic excited domain that has new structural and electronic orders quite different from the starting ground state (equilibrium phase).
