= BKL singularity =

General relativity model near spacetime singularities

A spherical body undergoing a chaotic BKL (Mixmaster) dynamics close to singularity according to rules eq. 35. Simulation was made in Mathematica with initial $u = \sqrt{13}$. (Note: A similar animated simulation by David Garfinkle can be found in.)

A Belinski–Khalatnikov–Lifshitz (BKL) singularity is a model of the dynamic evolution of the universe near the initial gravitational singularity, described by an anisotropic, chaotic solution of the Einstein field equation of gravitation. According to this model, the universe is chaotically oscillating around a gravitational singularity in which time and space become equal to zero or, equivalently, the spacetime curvature becomes infinitely big. This singularity is physically real in the sense that it is a necessary property of the solution, and will appear also in the exact solution of those equations. The singularity is not artificially created by the assumptions and simplifications made by the other special solutions such as the Friedmann–Lemaître–Robertson–Walker, quasi-isotropic, and Kasner solutions.

The model is named after its authors Vladimir Belinski, Isaak Khalatnikov, and Evgeny Lifshitz, then working at the Landau Institute for Theoretical Physics.

The picture developed by BKL has several important elements. These are:

- Near the singularity the evolution of the geometry at different spatial points decouples so that the solutions of the partial differential equations can be approximated by solutions of ordinary differential equations with respect to time for appropriately defined spatial scale factors. This is called the BKL conjecture.
- For most types of matter the effect of the matter fields on the dynamics of the geometry becomes negligible near the singularity. Or, in the words of John Wheeler, "matter doesn't matter" near a singularity. The original BKL work posed a negligible effect for all matter but later they theorized that "stiff matter" (equation of state p = ε) equivalent to a massless scalar field can have a modifying effect on the dynamics near the singularity.
- The ordinary differential equations describing the asymptotics come from a class of spatially homogeneous solutions which constitute the Mixmaster dynamics: a complicated oscillatory and chaotic model that exhibits properties similar to those discussed by BKL.

The dynamics of the universe near the cosmological singularity is a developing field in modern theoretical and mathematical physics. The generalization of the BKL model to the cosmological singularity in multidimensional (Kaluza–Klein type) cosmological models has chaotic characteristics in spacetimes with dimensionality less than or equal to ten. In the spacetimes with higher dimensionalities, a universe after undergoing a finite number of oscillations enters into monotonic Kasner-type contracting regime.

The development of cosmological studies based on superstring models has revealed some new aspects of the dynamics in the vicinity of the singularity. In these models, mechanisms of changing of Kasner epochs are provoked not by the gravitational interactions but by the influence of other fields present. It was proved that the cosmological models based on six main superstring models plus eleven-dimensional supergravity model exhibit the chaotic BKL dynamics towards the singularity. A connection was discovered between oscillatory BKL-like cosmological models and a special subclass of infinite-dimensional Lie algebras – the so-called hyperbolic Kac–Moody algebras.

== Introduction ==
The basis of modern cosmology are the special solutions of the Einstein field equations found by Alexander Friedmann in 1922–1924. The Universe is assumed homogeneous (space has the same metric properties (measures) in all points) and isotropic (space has the same measures in all directions). Friedmann's solutions allow two possible geometries for space: closed model with a ball-like, outwards-bowed space (positive curvature) and open model with a saddle-like, inwards-bowed space (negative curvature). In both models, the Universe is not standing still, it is constantly either expanding (becoming larger) or contracting (shrinking, becoming smaller). This was confirmed by Edwin Hubble who established the Hubble redshift of receding galaxies. The present consensus is that the isotropic model, in general, gives an adequate description of the present state of the Universe; however, isotropy of the present Universe by itself is not a reason to expect that it is adequate for describing the early stages of Universe evolution. At the same time, it is obvious that in the real world homogeneity is, at best, only an approximation. Even if one can speak about a homogeneous distribution of matter density at distances that are large compared to the intergalactic space, this homogeneity vanishes at smaller scales. On the other hand, the homogeneity assumption goes very far in a mathematical aspect: it makes the solution highly symmetric which can impart specific properties that disappear when considering a more general case.

Another important property of the isotropic model is the inevitable existence of a time singularity: time flow is not continuous, but stops or reverses after time reaches some very large or very small value. Between singularities, time flows in one direction: away from the singularity (arrow of time). In the open model, there is one time singularity so time is limited at one end but unlimited at the other, while in the closed model there are two singularities that limit time at both ends (the Big Bang and Big Crunch).

The only physically interesting properties of spacetimes (such as singularities) are those which are stable, i.e., those properties which still occur when the initial data is perturbed slightly. It is possible for a singularity to be stable and yet be of no physical interest: stability is a necessary but not a sufficient condition for physical relevance. For example, a singularity could be stable only in a neighbourhood of initial data sets corresponding to highly anisotropic universes. Since the actual universe is now apparently almost isotropic such a singularity could not occur in our universe. A sufficient condition for a stable singularity to be of physical interest is the requirement that the singularity be generic (or general). Roughly speaking, a stable singularity is generic if it occurs near every set of initial conditions and the non-gravitational fields are restricted in some specified way to "physically realistic" fields so that the Einstein equations, various equations of state, etc., are assumed to hold on the evolved spacetimes. It might happen that a singularity is stable under small variations of the true gravitational degrees of freedom, and yet it is not generic because the singularity depends in some way on the coordinate system, or rather on the choice of the initial hypersurface from which the spacetime is evolved.

For a system of non-linear differential equations, such as the Einstein equations, a general solution is not unambiguously defined. In principle, there may be multiple general integrals, and each of those may contain only a finite subset of all possible initial conditions. Each of those integrals may contain all required independent functions which, however, may be subject to some conditions (e.g., some inequalities). Existence of a general solution with a singularity, therefore, does not preclude the existence of other additional general solutions that do not contain a singularity. For example, there is no reason to doubt the existence of a general solution without a singularity that describes an isolated body with a relatively small mass.

It is impossible to find a general integral for all space and for all time. However, this is not necessary for resolving the problem: it is sufficient to study the solution near the singularity. This would also resolve another aspect of the problem: the characteristics of spacetime metric evolution in the general solution when it reaches the physical singularity, understood as a point where matter density and invariants of the Riemann curvature tensor become infinite.

== Existence of physical time singularity ==
One of the principal problems studied by the Landau group (to which BKL belong) was whether relativistic cosmological models necessarily contain a time singularity or whether the time singularity is an artifact of the assumptions used to simplify these models. The independence of the singularity on symmetry assumptions would mean that time singularities exist not only in the special, but also in the general solutions of the Einstein equations. It is reasonable to suggest that if a singularity is present in the general solution, there must be some indications that are based only on the most general properties of the Einstein equations, although those indications by themselves might be insufficient for characterizing the singularity.

A criterion for generality of solutions is the number of independent space coordinate functions that they contain. These include only the "physically independent" functions whose number cannot be reduced by any choice of reference frame. In the general solution, the number of such functions must be enough to fully define the initial conditions (distribution and movement of matter, distribution of gravitational field) at some moment of time chosen as initial. This number is four for an empty (vacuum) space, and eight for a matter and/or radiation-filled space.

Previous work by the Landau group; reviewed in) led to the conclusion that the general solution does not contain a physical singularity. This search for a broader class of solutions with a singularity has been done, essentially, by a trial-and-error method, since a systematic approach to the study of the Einstein equations was lacking. A negative result, obtained in this way, is not convincing by itself; a solution with the necessary degree of generality would invalidate it, and at the same time would confirm any positive results related to the specific solution.

At that time, the only known indication for the existence of physical singularity in the general solution was related to the form of the Einstein equations written in a synchronous frame, that is, in a frame in which the proper time x^{0} = t is synchronized throughout the whole space; in this frame the space distance element dl is separate from the time interval dt. (Note: The convention used by BKL is the same as in the Landau & Lifshitz (1988) book. The Latin indices run through the values 0, 1, 2, 3; Greek indices run through the space values 1, 2, 3. The metric g_{ik} has the signature (+ − − −); γ_{αβ} = −g_{αβ} is the 3-dimensional space metric tensor. BKL use a system of units, in which the speed of light and the Einstein gravitational constant are equal to 1.) The Einstein equation

$R_0^{0}=T_0^{0}-\tfrac{1}{2}T$	eq. 1

written in synchronous frame gives a result in which the metric determinant g inevitably becomes zero in a finite time irrespective of any assumptions about matter distribution.

However, the efforts to find a general physical singularity were foregone after it became clear that the singularity mentioned above is linked with a specific geometric property of the synchronous frame: the crossing of time line coordinates. This crossing takes place on some encircling hypersurfaces which are four-dimensional analogs of the caustic surfaces in geometrical optics; g becomes zero exactly at this crossing. Therefore, although this singularity is general, it is fictitious, and not a physical one; it disappears when the reference frame is changed. This, apparently, dissuaded the researchers for further investigations along these lines.

Several years passed before the interest in this problem waxed again when Penrose (1965) published his theorems that linked the existence of a singularity of unknown character with some very general assumptions that did not have anything in common with a choice of reference frame. Other similar theorems were found later on by Hawking and Geroch (see Penrose–Hawking singularity theorems). This revived interest in the search for singular solutions.

== Generalized homogeneous solution ==
In a space that is both homogeneous and isotropic the metric is determined completely, leaving free only the sign of the curvature. Assuming only space homogeneity with no additional symmetry such as isotropy leaves considerably more freedom in choosing the metric. The following pertains to the space part of the metric at a given instant of time t assuming a synchronous frame so that t is the same synchronised time for the whole space.

=== The BKL conjecture ===
In their 1970 work, BKL stated that as one approaches a singularity, terms containing time derivatives in Einstein's equations dominate over those containing spatial derivatives. This has since been known as the BKL conjecture and implies that Einstein's partial differential equations (PDE) are well approximated by ordinary differential equations (ODEs), whence the dynamics of general relativity effectively become local and oscillatory. The time evolution of fields at each spatial point is well approximated by the homogeneous cosmologies in the Bianchi classification.

By separating the time and space derivatives in the Einstein equations, for example, in the way used for the classification of homogeneous spaces, and then setting the terms containing space derivatives equal to zero, one can define the so-called truncated theory of the system (truncated equations). Then, the BKL conjecture can be made more specific:

Weak conjecture: As the singularity is approached the terms containing space derivatives in the Einstein equations are negligible in comparison to the terms containing time derivatives. Thus, as the singularity is approached the Einstein equations approach those found by setting derivative terms to zero. Thus, the weak conjecture says that the Einstein equations can be well approximated by the truncated equations in the vicinity of the singularity. Note that this does not imply that the solutions of the full equations of motion will approach the solutions to the truncated equations as the singularity is approached. This additional condition is captured in the strong version as follows.

Strong conjecture: As the singularity is approached the Einstein equations approach those of the truncated theory and in addition the solutions to the full equations are well approximated by solutions to the truncated equations.

In the beginning, the BKL conjecture seemed to be coordinate-dependent and rather implausible. Barrow and Tipler, for example, among the ten criticisms of BKL studies, include the inappropriate (according to them) choice of synchronous frame as a means to separate time and space derivatives. The BKL conjecture was sometimes rephrased in the literature as a statement that near the singularity only the time derivatives are important. Such a statement, taken at face value, is wrong or at best misleading since, as shown in the BKL analysis itself, space-like gradients of the metric tensor cannot be neglected for generic solutions of pure Einstein gravity in four spacetime dimensions, and in fact play a crucial role in the appearance of the oscillatory regime. However, there exist reformulations of Einstein theory in terms of new variables involving the relevant gradients, for example in Ashtekar-like variables, for which the statement about the dominant role of the time derivatives is correct. It is true that one gets at each spatial point an effective description of the singularity in terms of a finite dimensional dynamical system described by ordinary differential equations with respect to time, but the spatial gradients do enter these equations non-trivially.

Subsequent analysis by a large number of authors has shown that the BKL conjecture can be made precise and by now there is an impressive body of numerical and analytical evidence in its support. It is fair to say that we are still quite far from a proof of the strong conjecture. But there has been outstanding progress in simpler models. In particular, Berger, Garfinkle, Moncrief, Isenberg, Weaver, and others showed that, in a class of models, as the singularity is approached the solutions to the full Einstein field equations approach the "velocity term dominated" (truncated) ones obtained by neglecting spatial derivatives. Andersson and Rendall showed that for gravity coupled to a massless scalar field or a stiff fluid, for every solution to the truncated equations there exists a solution to the full field equations that converges to the truncated solution as the singularity is approached, even in the absence of symmetries. These results were generalized to also include p-form gauge fields. In these truncated models the dynamics are simpler, allowing a precise statement of the conjecture that could be proven. In the general case, the strongest evidence to date comes from numerical evolutions. Berger and Moncrief began a program to analyze generic cosmological singularities. While the initial work focused on symmetry reduced cases, more recently Garfinkle performed numerical evolution of space-times with no symmetries in which, again, the mixmaster behavior is apparent. Finally, additional support for the conjecture has come from a numerical study of the behavior of test fields near the singularity of a Schwarzschild black hole.

=== Kasner solution ===
Dynamics of Kasner metrics eq. 2 in spherical coordinates towards singularity. The Lifshitz-Khalatnikov parameter is u=2 (1/u=0.5) and the r coordinate is 2p_{α}(1/u)τ where τ is logarithmic time: τ = ln t. (Note: The expression for r is derived by logarithming the power coefficients in the metric: ln [t^{2p_{α}(1/u)}] = 2p_{α}(1/u) ln t.) Shrinking along the axes is linear and anisotropic (no chaoticity).

The BKL approach to anisotropic (as opposed to isotropic) homogeneous spaces starts with a generalization of an exact particular solution derived by Kasner for a field in vacuum, in which the space is homogeneous and has a Euclidean metric that depends on time according to the Kasner metric

$dl^2=t^{2p_1}dx^2+t^{2p_2}dy^2+t^{2p_3}dz^2$	eq. 2

(dl is the line element; dx, dy, dz are infinitesimal displacements in the three spatial dimensions, and t is time period passed since some initial moment t_{0} = 0). Here, p_{1}, p_{2}, p_{3} are any three numbers that satisfy the following Kasner conditions

$p_1+p_2+p_3=p_1^2+p_2^2+p_3^2=1.$	eq. 3

Because of these relations, only one of the three numbers is independent (two equations with three unknowns). All three numbers are never the same; two numbers are the same only in the sets of values $(-\frac {1}{3},\frac{2}{3},\frac {2}{3})$ and (0, 0, 1). (Note: When (p_{1}, p_{2}, p_{3}) = (0, 0, 1) the spacetime metric eq. 1 with dl^{2} from eq. 2 transforms to Galilean metric with the substitution t sh z = ζ, t ch z = τ, that is, the singularity is fictional and the spacetime is flat.) In all other cases the numbers are different, one number is negative and the other two are positive. This is partially proved by squaring both sides of the first condition eq. 3 and developing the square:

$$\left ( p_1 + p_2 + p_3 \right )^2 = \left ( p_1^2 + p_2^2 + p_3^2 \right ) + \left ( 2 p_1 p_2 + 2 p_2 p_3 + 2 p_1 p_3 \right ) = 1$$

The term $\left ( p_1^2 + p_2^2 + p_3^2 \right )$ is equal to 1 by dint of the second condition eq. 3 and therefore the term with the mixed products should be zero. This is possible if at least one of the p_{1}, p_{2}, p_{3} is negative.

If the numbers are arranged in increasing order, p_{1} < p_{2} < p_{3}, they change in the intervals (Fig. 4)

$$\begin{matrix} -\tfrac {1}{3} \le p_1 \le 0, \\ \ 0 \le p_2 \le \tfrac{2}{3},\\ \frac{2}{3} \le p_3 \le 1.\end{matrix}$$	eq. 4

Plot of p_{1}, p_{2}, p_{3} with an argument 1/u. The numbers p_{1}(u) and p_{3}(u) are monotonously increasing while p_{2}(u) is a monotonously decreasing function of u.

The Kasner metric eq. 2 corresponds to a flat homogenous but anisotropic space in which all volumes increase with time in such a way that the linear distances along two axes y and z increase while the distance along the axis x decreases. The moment t = 0 causes a singularity in the solution; the singularity in the metric at t = 0 cannot be avoided by any reference frame transformation. At the singularity, the invariants of the four-dimensional curvature tensor go to infinity. An exception is the case p_{1} = р_{2} = 0, р_{3} = 1; these values correspond to a flat spacetime: the transformation t sh z = ζ, t ch z = τ turns the Kasner metric (eq. 2) into Galilean.

BKL parametrize the numbers p_{1}, p_{2}, p_{3} in terms of a single independent (real) parameter u (Lifshitz-Khalatnikov parameter) as follows

$p_1(u)=\frac {-u}{1+u+u^2},\ p_2(u)=\frac {1+u}{1+u+u^2},\ p_3(u)=\frac {u(1+u)}{1+u+u^2}$	eq. 5

The Kasner index parametrization appears mysterious until one thinks about the two constraints on the indices eq. 3. Both constraints fix the overall scale of the indices so that only their ratios can vary. It is natural to pick one of those ratios as a new parameter, which can be done in six different ways. Picking u = u_{32} = p_{3} / p_{2}, for example, it is trivial to express all six possible ratios in terms of it. Eliminating p_{3} = up_{2} first, and then using the linear constraint to eliminate p_{1} = 1 − p_{2} − up_{2} = 1 − (1 + u)p_{2}, the quadratic constraint reduces to a quadratic equation in p_{2}

$\left [ 1 - \left ( 1 + u \right ) p_2 \right ]^2 + p_2^2 + \left ( up_2 \right )^2 = 1$	eq. 5a

with roots p_{2} = 0 (obvious) and p_{2} = (1 + u) / (1 + u + u^{2}), from which p_{1} and p_{3} are then obtained by back substitution. One can define six such parameters u_{ab} = p_{a} / p_{b}, for which p_{c} ≤ p_{b} ≤ p_{a} when (c, b, a) is a cyclic permutation of (1, 2, 3).

All different values of p_{1}, p_{2}, p_{3} ordered as above are obtained with u running in the range u ≥ 1. The values u < 1 are brought into this range according to

$p_1 \left( \frac {1}{u} \right )=p_1(u),\ p_2 \left( \frac {1}{u} \right )=p_3(u),\ p_3 \left( \frac {1}{u} \right )=p_2(u)$	eq. 6

In the generalized solution, the form corresponding to eq. 2 applies only to the asymptotic metric (the metric close to the singularity t = 0), respectively, to the major terms of its series expansion by powers of t. In the synchronous reference frame it is written in the form of eq. 1 with a space distance element

$dl^2= \left (a^2l_{\alpha}l_{\beta}+b^2m_{\alpha}m_{\beta}+c^2n_{\alpha}n_{\beta} \right )dx^{\alpha}dx^{\beta}$	eq. 7

where

$a=t^{p_l},\ b=t^{p_m},\ c=t^{p_n}$	eq. 8

The three-dimensional vectors l, m, n define the directions at which space distance changes with time by the power laws eq. 8. These vectors, as well as the numbers p_{l}, p_{m}, p_{n} which, as before, are related by eq. 3, are functions of the space coordinates. The powers p_{l}, p_{m}, p_{n} are not arranged in increasing order, reserving the symbols p_{1}, p_{2}, p_{3} for the numbers in eq. 5 that remain arranged in increasing order. The determinant of the metric of eq. 7 is

$-g=a^2b^2c^2v^2=t^2v^2$	eq. 9

where v = l[mn]. It is convenient to introduce the following quantities (Note: Here and below all symbols for vector operations (vector products, the operations rot, grad, etc.) should be understood in a very formal way as operations over the covariant components of the vectors l, m, n such that are performed in Cartesian coordinates x^{1}, x^{2}, x^{3}.)

$\lambda=\frac{\mathbf{l}\ \mathrm{curl}\ \mathbf{l}}{v},\ \mu=\frac{\mathbf{m}\ \mathrm{curl}\ \mathbf{m}}{v},\ \nu=\frac{\mathbf{n}\ \mathrm{curl}\ \mathbf{n}}{v}.$	eq. 10

The space metric in eq. 7 is anisotropic because the powers of t in eq. 8 cannot have the same values. On approaching the singularity at t = 0, the linear distances in each space element decrease in two directions and increase in the third direction. The volume of the element decreases in proportion to t.

The Kasner metric is introduced in the Einstein equations by substituting the respective metric tensor γ_{αβ} from eq. 7 without defining a priori the dependence of a, b, c from t:

$$\varkappa_{\alpha}^{\beta}=\frac{2 \dot a}{a}l_{\alpha}l^{\beta}+\frac{2 \dot b}{b}m_{\alpha}m^{\beta}+\frac{2 \dot c}{c}n_{\alpha}n^{\beta}$$

where the dot above a symbol designates differentiation with respect to time. The Einstein equation eq. 11 takes the form

$-R_0^0=\frac{\ddot a}{a}+\frac{\ddot b}{b}+\frac{\ddot c}{c}=0.$	eq. 14

All its terms are to a second order for the large (at t → 0) quantity 1/t. In the Einstein equations eq. 12, terms of such order appear only from terms that are time-differentiated. If the components of P_{αβ} do not include terms of order higher than two, then

$-R_l^l=\frac{(\dot a b c)\dot{ }}{abc}=0,\ -R_m^m=\frac{(a \dot b c)\dot{ }}{abc}=0,\ -R_n^n=\frac{(a b \dot c)\dot{ }}{abc}=0$	eq. 15

where indices l, m, n designate tensor components in the directions l, m, n. These equations together with eq. 14 give the expressions eq. 8 with powers that satisfy eq. 3.

However, the presence of one negative power among the 3 powers p_{l}, p_{m}, p_{n} results in appearance of terms from P_{αβ} with an order greater than t^{−2}. If the negative power is p_{l} (p_{l} = p_{1} < 0), then P_{αβ} contains the coordinate function λ and eq. 12 become

$$\begin{align} -R_l^l & =\frac{(\dot a b c)\dot{ }}{abc}+\frac{\lambda^2 a^2}{2b^2 c^2}=0,\\ -R_m^m & =\frac{(a \dot b c)\dot{ }}{abc}-\frac{\lambda^2 a^2}{2b^2 c^2}=0,\\ -R_n^n & =\frac{(a b \dot c)\dot{ }}{abc}-\frac{\lambda^2 a^2}{2b^2 c^2}=0.\\ \end{align}$$	eq. 16

Here, the second terms are of order t^{−2(p_{m} + p_{n} − p_{l})} whereby p_{m} + p_{n} − p_{l} = 1 + 2 |p_{l}| > 1. (Note: Excepting the case (p_{1}, p_{2}, p_{3}) = (0, 0, 1), in which the metric singularity is fictitious.) To remove these terms and restore the metric eq. 7, it is necessary to impose on the coordinate functions the condition λ = 0.

The remaining three Einstein equations eq. 13 contain only first order time derivatives of the metric tensor. They give three time-independent relations that must be imposed as necessary conditions on the coordinate functions in eq. 7. This, together with the condition λ = 0, makes four conditions. These conditions bind ten different coordinate functions: three components of each of the vectors l, m, n, and one function in the powers of t (any one of the functions p_{l}, p_{m}, p_{n}, which are bound by the conditions eq. 3). When calculating the number of physically arbitrary functions, it must be taken into account that the synchronous system used here allows time-independent arbitrary transformations of the three space coordinates. Therefore, the final solution contains overall 10 − 4 − 3 = 3 physically arbitrary functions which is one less than what is needed for the general solution in vacuum.

The degree of generality reached at this point is not lessened by introducing matter; matter is written into the metric eq. 7 and contributes four new coordinate functions necessary to describe the initial distribution of its density and the three components of its velocity. This makes possible to determine matter evolution merely from the laws of its movement in an a priori given gravitational field which are the hydrodynamic equations

$\frac{1}{\sqrt{-g}}\frac{\partial}{\partial x^i} \left (\sqrt{-g}\sigma u^i \right ) = 0,$	eq. 17

$(p+\varepsilon) u^k \left \{ \frac{\partial u_i}{\partial x^k}-\frac{1}{2} u^l \frac{\partial g_{kl}}{\partial x^i} \right \rbrace =-\frac{\partial p}{\partial x^i}-u_i u^k \frac{\partial p}{\partial x^k},$	eq. 18

where u^{i} is the 4-dimensional velocity, ε and σ are the densities of energy and entropy of matter (cf. and; also; for details see). For the ultrarelativistic equation of state p = ε/3 the entropy σ ~ ε^{1/4}. The major terms in eq. 17 and eq. 18 are those that contain time derivatives. From eq. 17 and the space components of eq. 18 one has

$$\frac{\partial}{\partial t} \left (\sqrt{-g} u_0 \varepsilon^{\frac{3}{4}} \right ) = 0,\ 4 \varepsilon \cdot \frac{\partial u_{\alpha}}{\partial t}+u_{\alpha} \cdot \frac{\partial \varepsilon}{\partial t} = 0,$$

resulting in

$abc u_0 \varepsilon^{\frac{3}{4}}= \mathrm{const},\ u_{\alpha} \varepsilon^{\frac{1}{4}}= \mathrm{const},$	eq. 19

where 'const' are time-independent quantities. Additionally, from the identity u_{i}u^{i} = 1 one has (because all covariant components of u_{α} are to the same order)

$$u_0^2 \approx u_n u^n = \frac{u_n^2}{c^2},$$

where u_{n} is the velocity component along the direction of n that is connected with the highest (positive) power of t (supposing that p_{n} = p_{3}). From the above relations, it follows that

$\varepsilon \sim \frac{1}{a^2 b^2},\ u_{\alpha} \sim \sqrt{ab}$	eq. 20

or

$\varepsilon \sim t^{-2(p_1+p_2)}=t^{-2(1-p_3)},\ u_{\alpha} \sim t^{\frac{(1-p_3)}{2}}.$	eq. 21

The above equations can be used to confirm that the components of the matter stress-energy-momentum tensor standing in the right hand side of the equations

$$R_0^0 = T_0^0 - \frac{1}{2}T,\ R_{\alpha}^{\beta} = T_{\alpha}^{\beta}- \frac{1}{2}\delta_{\alpha}^{\beta}T,$$

are, indeed, to a lower order by 1/t than the major terms in their left hand sides. In the equations $R_{\alpha}^0 = T_{\alpha}^0$ the presence of matter results only in the change of relations imposed on their constituent coordinate functions.

The fact that ε becomes infinite by the law eq. 21 confirms that in the solution to eq. 7 one deals with a physical singularity at any values of the powers p_{1}, p_{2}, p_{3} excepting only (0, 0, 1). For these last values, the singularity is non-physical and can be removed by a change of reference frame.

The fictional singularity corresponding to the powers (0, 0, 1) arises as a result of time line coordinates crossing over some 2-dimensional "focal surface". As pointed out in, a synchronous reference frame can always be chosen in such a way that this inevitable time line crossing occurs exactly on such surface (instead of a 3-dimensional caustic surface). Therefore, a solution with such simultaneous for the whole space fictional singularity must exist with a full set of arbitrary functions needed for the general solution. Close to the point t = 0 it allows a regular expansion by whole powers of t. For an analysis of this case, see.

== Oscillating mode towards the singularity ==
The general solution by definition is completely stable; otherwise the Universe would not exist. Any perturbation is equivalent to a change in the initial conditions in some moment of time; since the general solution allows arbitrary initial conditions, the perturbation is not able to change its character. Looked at such angle, the four conditions imposed on the coordinate functions in the solution eq. 7 are of different types: three conditions that arise from the equations $R_{\alpha}^0$= 0 are "natural"; they are a consequence of the structure of Einstein equations. However, the additional condition λ = 0 that causes the loss of one derivative function, is of entirely different type: instability caused by perturbations can break this condition. The action of such perturbation must bring the model to another, more general, mode. The perturbation cannot be considered as small: a transition to a new mode exceeds the range of very small perturbations.

The analysis of the behavior of the model under perturbative action, performed by BKL, delineates a complex oscillatory mode on approaching the singularity. They could not give all details of this mode in the broad frame of the general case. However, BKL explained the most important properties and character of the solution on specific models that allow far-reaching analytical study.

These models are based on a homogeneous space metric of a particular type. Supposing a homogeneity of space without any additional symmetry leaves a great freedom in choosing the metric. All possible homogeneous (but anisotropic) spaces are classified, according to Bianchi, in several Bianchi types (Type I to IX). (see also Generalized homogeneous solution) BKL investigate only spaces of Bianchi Types VIII and IX.

If the metric has the form of eq. 7, for each type of homogeneous spaces exists some functional relation between the reference vectors l, m, n and the space coordinates. The specific form of this relation is not important. The important fact is that for Type VIII and IX spaces, the quantities λ, μ, ν eq. 10 are constants while all "mixed" products l rot m, l rot n, m rot l, etc.. are zeros. For Type IX spaces, the quantities λ, μ, ν have the same sign and one can write λ = μ = ν = 1 (the simultaneous sign change of the 3 constants does not change anything). For Type VIII spaces, 2 constants have a sign that is opposite to the sign of the third constant; one can write, for example, λ = − 1, μ = ν = 1. (Note: The constants λ, μ, ν are the so-called structural constants of the space movement group.)

The study of the effect of the perturbation on the "Kasner mode" is thus confined to a study on the effect of the λ-containing terms in the Einstein equations. Type VIII and IX spaces are the most suitable models for such a study. Since all 3 quantities λ, μ, ν in those Bianchi types differ from zero, the condition λ = 0 does not hold irrespective of which direction l, m, n has negative power law time dependence.

The Einstein equations for the Type VIII and Type IX space models are

$$\begin{align} -R_l^l & =\frac{\left(\dot a b c\right)\dot{ }}{abc}+\frac{1}{2}\left (a^2b^2c^2\right )\left [\lambda^2 a^4-\left (\mu b^2-\nu c^2\right )^2\right ]=0,\\ -R_m^m & =\frac{(a \dot{b} c)\dot{ }}{abc}+\frac{1}{2}\left(a^2b^2c^2\right )\left [\mu^2 b^4-\left(\lambda a^2-\nu c^2\right)^2\right]=0,\\ -R_n^n & =\frac{\left(a b \dot c\right)\dot{ }}{abc}+\frac{1}{2}\left(a^2b^2c^2\right)\left[\nu^2 c^4-\left(\lambda a^2-\mu b^2\right)^2\right]=0,\\ \end{align}$$	eq. 22

$-R_0^0=\frac{\ddot a}{a}+\frac{\ddot b}{b}+\frac{\ddot c}{c}=0$	eq. 23

(the remaining components $R_l^0$, $R_m^0$, $R_n^0$, $R_l^m$, $R_l^n$, $R_m^n$ are identically zeros). These equations contain only functions of time; this is a condition that has to be fulfilled in all homogeneous spaces. Here, the eq. 22 and eq. 23 are exact and their validity does not depend on how near one is to the singularity at t = 0. (Note: In their exact form, the Einstein equations for homogeneous space contain, in general, 6 different functions of time γ_{ab}(t) in the metric. The fact that in the present case a consistent system of exact equations is obtained for the metric which contains only 3 functions of time (γ_{11} = а^{2}, γ_{22} = b^{2}, γ_{33} = c^{2}) is related to a symmetry that leads to the disappearance of 6 Ricci tensor components.)

The time derivatives in eq. 22 and eq. 23 take a simpler form if а, b, с are substituted by their logarithms α, β, γ:

$a=e^\alpha,\ b=e^\beta,\ c=e^\gamma,$	eq. 24

substituting the variable t for τ according to:

$dt=abc\ d\tau.$	eq. 25

Then (subscripts denote differentiation by τ):

$$\begin{align} 2\alpha_{\tau\tau} & =\left (\mu b^2-\nu c^2\right )^2-\lambda^2 a^4=0,\\ 2\beta_{\tau\tau} & =\left (\lambda a^2-\nu c^2\right )^2-\mu^2 b^4=0,\\ 2\gamma_{\tau\tau} & =\left (\lambda a^2-\mu b^2\right )^2-\nu^2 c^4=0,\\ \end{align}$$	eq. 26

$\frac{1}{2}\left(\alpha+\beta+\gamma \right)_{\tau\tau}=\alpha_\tau \beta_\tau +\alpha_\tau \gamma_\tau+\beta_\tau \gamma_\tau.$	eq. 27

Adding together equations eq. 26 and substituting in the left hand side the sum (α + β + γ)_{τ τ} according to eq. 27, one obtains an equation containing only first derivatives which is the first integral of the system eq. 26:

$\alpha_\tau \beta_\tau +\alpha_\tau \gamma_\tau+\beta_\tau \gamma_\tau = \frac{1}{4}\left(\lambda^2a^4+\mu^2b^4+\nu^2c^4-2\lambda \mu a^2b^2-2\lambda \nu a^2c^2-2\mu \nu b^2c^2 \right).$	eq. 28

This equation plays the role of a binding condition imposed on the initial state of eq. 26. The Kasner mode eq. 8 is a solution of eq. 26 when ignoring all terms in the right hand sides. But such situation cannot go on (at t → 0) indefinitely because among those terms there are always some that grow. Thus, if the negative power is in the function a(t) (p_{l} = p_{1}) then the perturbation of the Kasner mode will arise by the terms λ^{2}a^{4}; the rest of the terms will decrease with decreasing t. If only the growing terms are left in the right hand sides of eq. 26, one obtains the system:

$\alpha_{\tau\tau}=-\frac{1}{2}\lambda^2e^{4\alpha},\ \beta_{\tau\tau}=\gamma_{\tau\tau}=\frac{1}{2}\lambda^2e^{4\alpha}$	eq. 29

(compare eq. 16; below it is substituted λ^{2} = 1). The solution of these equations must describe the metric evolution from the initial state, in which it is described by eq. 8 with a given set of powers (with p_{l} < 0); let p_{l} = р_{1}, p_{m} = р_{2}, p_{n} = р_{3} so that

$a \sim t^{p_1},\ b \sim t^{p_2},\ c \sim t^{p_3}.$	eq. 30

Then

$abc=\Lambda t,\ \tau=\Lambda^{-1}\ln t+\mathrm{const}$	eq. 31

where Λ is constant. Initial conditions for eq. 29 are redefined as

$\alpha_\tau=\Lambda p_1,\ \beta_\tau=\Lambda p_2,\ \gamma_\tau=\Lambda p_3\ \mathrm{at}\ \tau \to \infty$	eq. 32

Equations eq. 29 are easily integrated; the solution that satisfies the condition eq. 32 is

$$\begin{cases}a^2=\frac{2|p_1|\Lambda}{\operatorname{ch}(2|p_1|\Lambda\tau)}, \\ b^2=b_0^2e^{2\Lambda(p_2-|p_1|)\tau}\operatorname{ch}(2|p_1|\Lambda\tau),\\ c^2=c_0^2e^{2\Lambda(p_2-|p_1|)\tau}\operatorname{ch}(2|p_1|\Lambda\tau),\end{cases}$$	eq. 33

where b_{0} and c_{0} are two more constants.

It can easily be seen that the asymptotic of functions eq. 33 at t → 0 is eq. 30. The asymptotic expressions of these functions and the function t(τ) at τ → −∞ is (Note: The asymptotic values of α_{τ}, β_{τ}, γ_{τ} at τ → −∞ can be found without fully solving eq. 29. It suffices to note that the first of these equations has a form of a "particle" moving in one dimension in the field of an exponential potential wall with α playing the role of a constant. In this analogy, the Kasner mode refers to a free movement with constant velocity α_{τ} = Λp_{1}. After reflection from the wall, the particle moves freely with velocity α_{τ} = −Λp_{1}. Also noting that from eq. 29 α_{τ} + β_{τ} = const, and α_{τ} + γ_{τ} = const, one can see that β_{τ} and γ_{τ} take the values β_{τ} = Λ(p_{2} − 2p_{1}), γ_{τ} = Λ(p_{3} − 2p_{1}).)

$$a \sim e^{-\Lambda p_1\tau},\ b \sim e^{\Lambda(p_2+2p_1)\tau},\ c \sim e^{\Lambda(p_3+2p_1)\tau},\ t \sim e^{\Lambda(1+2p_1)\tau}.$$

Expressing a, b, c as functions of t, one has

$a \sim t^{p'_l}, b \sim t^{p'_m}, c \sim t^{p'_n}$	eq. 34

where

$p'_l=\frac{|p_1|}{1-2|p_1|}, p'_m=-\frac{2|p_1|-p_2}{1-2|p_1|}, p'_n=\frac{p_3-2|p_1|}{1-2|p_1|}.$	eq. 35

Then

$abc=\Lambda' t,\ \Lambda'=(1-2|p_1|)\Lambda.$	eq. 36

The above shows that perturbation acts in such a way that it changes one Kasner mode with another Kasner mode, and in this process the negative power of t flips from direction l to direction m: if before it was p_{l} < 0, now it is p'_{m} < 0. During this change the function a(t) passes through a maximum and b(t) passes through a minimum; b, which before was decreasing, now increases: a from increasing becomes decreasing; and the decreasing c(t) decreases further. The perturbation itself (λ^{2}a^{4α} in eq. 29), which before was increasing, now begins to decrease and die away. Further evolution similarly causes an increase in the perturbation from the terms with μ^{2} (instead of λ^{2}) in eq. 26, next change of the Kasner mode, and so on.

It is convenient to write the power substitution rule eq. 35 with the help of the parametrization eq. 5:

$$\begin{matrix} \mathrm{if} & p_l=p_{1}(u) & p_m=p_{2}(u) & p_n=p_{3}(u) \\ \mathrm{then} & p'_l=p_{2}(u-1) & p'_m=p_{1}(u-1) & p'_n=p_{3}(u-1) \end{matrix}$$	eq. 37

The greater of the two positive powers remains positive.

BKL call this flip of negative power between directions a Kasner epoch. The key to understanding the character of metric evolution on approaching singularity is exactly this process of Kasner epoch alternation with flipping of powers p_{l}, p_{m}, p_{n} by the rule eq. 37.

The successive alternations eq. 37 with flipping of the negative power p_{1} between directions l and m (Kasner epochs) continues by depletion of the whole part of the initial u until the moment at which u < 1. The value u < 1 transforms into u > 1 according to eq. 6; in this moment the negative power is p_{l} or p_{m} while p_{n} becomes the lesser of two positive numbers (p_{n} = p_{2}). The next series of Kasner epochs then flips the negative power between directions n and l or between n and m. At an arbitrary (irrational) initial value of u this process of alternation continues unlimited. (Note: Introduction of non-diagonal components of γ_{ab}(t) imparts some new features to the BKL model: rotations of axes corresponding to the Kasner epoch powers; this problem is studied in Belinsky, Khalatnikov & Lifshitz (1971))

In the exact solution of the Einstein equations, the powers p_{l}, p_{m}, p_{n} lose their original precise sense. This circumstance introduces some "fuzziness" in the determination of these numbers (and together with them, to the parameter u) which, although small, makes meaningless the analysis of any definite (for example, rational) values of u. Therefore, only these laws that concern arbitrary irrational values of u have any particular meaning.

The larger periods in which the scales of space distances along two axes oscillate while distances along the third axis decrease monotonously, are called eras; volumes decrease by a law close to ~ t. On transition from one era to the next, the direction in which distances decrease monotonously, flips from one axis to another. The order of these transitions acquires the asymptotic character of a random process. The same random order is also characteristic for the alternation of the lengths of successive eras (by era length, BKL understand the number of Kasner epoch that an era contains, and not a time interval).

To each era (s-th era) correspond a series of values of the parameter u starting from the greatest, $u_{\max}^{(s)}$, and through the values $u_{\max}^{(s)}$ − 1, $u_{\max}^{(s)}$ − 2, ..., reaching to the smallest, $u_{\min}^{(s)}$ < 1. Then

$u_{\min}^{(s)}=x^{(s)},\ u_{\max}^{(s)}=k^{(s)}+x^{(s)},$	eq. 41

that is, k^{(s)} = [$u_{\max}^{(s)}$] where the brackets mean the whole part of the value. The number k^{(s)} is the era length, measured by the number of Kasner epochs that the era contains. For the next era

$u_{\max}^{(s+1)}=\frac{1}{x^{(s)}},\ k^{(s+1)}=\left[\frac{1}{x^{(s)}}\right].$	eq. 42

In the limitless series of numbers u, composed by these rules, there are infinitesimally small (but never zero) values x^{(s)} and correspondingly infinitely large lengths k^{(s)}.

The era series become denser on approaching t = 0. However, the natural variable for describing the time course of this evolution is not the world time t, but its logarithm, ln t, by which the whole process of reaching the singularity is extended to −∞.

According to eq. 33, one of the functions a, b, c, that passes through a maximum during a transition between Kasner epochs, at the peak of its maximum is

$a_\max=\sqrt{2\Lambda|p_1(u)|}$	eq. 38

where it is supposed that a_{max} is large compared to b_{0} and c_{0}; in eq. 38 u is the value of the parameter in the Kasner epoch before transition. It can be seen from here that the peaks of consecutive maxima during each era are gradually lowered. Indeed, in the next Kasner epoch this parameter has the value u' = u − 1, and Λ is substituted according to eq. 36 with Λ' = Λ(1 − 2|p_{1}(u)|). Therefore, the ratio of 2 consecutive maxima is

$$\frac{a'_\max}{a_\max}=\left[\frac{p_1(u-1)}{p_1(u)}\left(1-2|p_1(u)|\right)\right]^{\frac{1}{2}};$$

and finally

$\frac{a'_\max}{a_\max}=\sqrt{\frac{u-1}{u}}\equiv \sqrt{\frac{u'}{u}}.$	eq. 39

The above are solutions to Einstein equations in vacuum. As for the pure Kasner mode, matter does not change the qualitative properties of this solution and can be written into it disregarding its reaction on the field. However, if one does this for the model under discussion, understood as an exact solution of the Einstein equations, the resulting picture of matter evolution would not have a general character and would be specific for the high symmetry imminent to the present model. Mathematically, this specificity is related to the fact that for the homogeneous space geometry discussed here, the Ricci tensor components $R_\alpha^0$ are identically zeros and therefore the Einstein equations would not allow movement of matter (which gives non-zero stress energy-momentum tensor components $T_\alpha^0$). In other words, the synchronous frame must also be co-moving with respect to matter. If one substitutes in eq. 19 u_{α} = 0, u^{0} = 1, it becomes ε ~ (abc)^{−4/3} ~ t^{−4/3}.

This difficulty is avoided if one includes in the model only the major terms of the limiting (at t → 0) metric and writes into it a matter with arbitrary initial distribution of densities and velocities. Then the course of evolution of matter is determined by its general laws of movement eq. 17 and eq. 18 that result in eq. 21. During each Kasner epoch, density increases by the law

$\varepsilon=t^{-2(1-p_3)},$	eq. 40

where p_{3} is, as above, the greatest of the numbers p_{1}, p_{2}, p_{3}. Matter density increases monotonously during all evolution towards the singularity.

== Metric evolution ==
Very large u values correspond to Kasner powers

$p_1 \approx -\frac{1}{u},\ p_2 \approx \frac{1}{u},\ p_3 \approx 1-\frac{1}{u^2},$	eq. 43

which are close to the values (0, 0, 1). Two values that are close to zero, are also close to each other, and therefore the changes in two out of the three types of "perturbations" (the terms with λ, μ and ν in the right hand sides of eq. 26) are also very similar. If in the beginning of such long era these terms are very close in absolute values in the moment of transition between two Kasner epochs (or made artificially such by assigning initial conditions) then they will remain close during the greatest part of the length of the whole era. In this case (BKL call this the case of small oscillations), analysis based on the action of one type of perturbations becomes incorrect; one must take into account the simultaneous effect of two perturbation types.

=== Two perturbations ===
Consider a long era, during which two of the functions a, b, c (let them be a and b) undergo small oscillations while the third function (c) decreases monotonously. The latter function quickly becomes small; consider the solution just in the region where one can ignore c in comparison to a and b. The calculations are first done for the Type IX space model by substituting accordingly λ = μ = ν = 1.

After ignoring function c, the first 2 equations eq. 26 give

$\alpha_{\tau\tau}+\beta_{\tau\tau}=0,\,$	eq. 44

$\alpha_{\tau\tau}-\beta_{\tau\tau}=e^{4\beta}-e^{4\alpha},\,$	eq. 45

and eq. 28 can be used as a third equation, which takes the form

$\gamma_{\tau\tau}\left(\alpha_{\tau\tau}+\beta_{\tau\tau}\right)=-\alpha_\tau\beta_\tau+\frac{1}{4}\left(e^{2\alpha}-e^{2\beta}\right)^2.$	eq. 46

The solution of eq. 44 is written in the form

$$\alpha+\beta=\frac{2a_0^2}{\xi_0}\left(\tau-\tau_0\right)+2\ln a_0,$$

where α_{0}, ξ_{0} are positive constants, and τ_{0} is the upper limit of the era for the variable τ. It is convenient to introduce further a new variable (instead of τ)

$\xi=\xi_0\exp \left[\frac{2a_0^2}{\xi_0}\left(\tau-\tau_0 \right)\right].$	eq. 47

Then

$\alpha+\beta=\ln \frac{\xi}{\xi_0}+2\ln a_0.$	eq. 48

Equations eq. 45 and eq. 46 are transformed by introducing the variable χ = α − β:

$\chi_{\xi\xi}=\frac{\chi_\xi}{\xi}+\frac{1}{2}\operatorname{sh}2\chi=0,$	eq. 49

$\gamma_\xi=-\frac{1}{4}\xi+\frac{1}{8}\xi\left(2\chi_\xi^2+\operatorname{ch}2\chi-1\right).$	eq. 50

Decrease of τ from τ_{0} to −∞ corresponds to a decrease of ξ from ξ_{0} to 0. The long era with close a and b (that is, with small χ), considered here, is obtained if ξ_{0} is a very large quantity. Indeed, at large ξ the solution of eq. 49 in the first approximation by 1/ξ is

$\chi=\alpha-\beta=\frac{2A}{\sqrt{\xi}}\sin \left(\xi-\xi_0\right),$	eq. 51

where A is constant; the multiplier $\tfrac{1}{\sqrt{\xi}}$ makes χ a small quantity so it can be substituted in eq. 49 by sh 2χ ≈ 2χ. (Note: The constant in the sine argument, of course, is not necessarily the same as ξ_{0} in eq. 47 and eq. 48; however, making them the same does not change in any way the solution character.)

From eq. 50 one obtains

$$\gamma_\xi=\frac{1}{4}\xi\left(2\chi_\xi^2+\chi^2\right)=A^2,\ \gamma=A^2\left(\xi-\xi_0\right)+\mathrm{const}.$$

After determining α and β from eq. 48 and eq. 51 and expanding e^{α} and e^{β} in series according to the above approximation, one obtains finally: (Note: In a more precise calculation, a slowly changing logarithmic term appears in the sine argument, and a multiplier appears in front the exponent in the expression for с(ξ), see Belinsky, Khalatnikov & Lifshitz 1970, Appendix B.)

$$\begin{cases} a\\ b \end{cases}=a_0\sqrt{\frac{\xi}{\xi_0}}\left[1\pm \frac{A}{\sqrt{\xi}}\sin \left(\xi-\xi_0\right)\right],$$	eq. 52

$c=c_0 e^{-A^2\left(\xi_0-\xi\right)}.$	eq. 53

The relation between the variable ξ and time t is obtained by integration of the definition dt = abc dτ which gives

$\frac{t}{t_0}=e^{-A^2\left(\xi_0-\xi\right)}.$	eq. 54

The constant c_{0} (the value of с at ξ = ξ_{0}) should be now c_{0} $\ll$ α_{0}·

Bianchi type VIII (open) space undergoing a chaotic BKL (Mixmaster) dynamics close to singularity according to rules eq. 35 with initial $u = \sqrt{13}$. The singularity is at the central pinch of the hyperboloid surface.

Let us now consider the domain ξ $\ll$ 1. Here the major terms in the solution of eq. 49 are:

$$\chi=\alpha-\beta=k\ln \xi+\mathrm{const},\,$$

where k is a constant in the range − 1 < k < 1; this condition ensures that the last term in eq. 49 is small (sh 2χ contains ξ^{2k} and ξ^{−2k}). Then, after determining α, β, and t, one obtains

$a \sim \xi^{\frac{1+k}{2}},\ b \sim \xi^{\frac{1-k}{2}},\ c \sim \xi^{-\frac{1-k^2}{4}},\ t \sim \xi^{\frac{3+k^2}{4}}.$	eq. 55

This is again a Kasner mode with the negative t power present in the function c(t). (Note: If in eq. 49, one substitutes sh 2χ with 2χ and solves it for all values of ξ, one obtains χ = c_{1}J_{0}(ξ) + c_{2}N_{0}(ξ) where J_{0}, N_{0} are Bessel functions of the I and II kind. This solution interpolates between the two limiting cases and allows to relate by an order of magnitude the constant parameters in eq. 52 and eq. 55.)

These results picture an evolution that is qualitatively similar to that, described above. During a long period of time that corresponds to a large decreasing ξ value, the two functions a and b oscillate, remaining close in magnitude $\tfrac{a-b}{a} \sim \tfrac{1}{\sqrt{\xi}}$; in the same time, both functions a and b slowly ($\sim \sqrt{\xi}$) decrease. The period of oscillations is constant by the variable ξ : Δξ = 2π (or, which is the same, with a constant period by logarithmic time: Δ ln t = 2πΑ^{2}). The third function, c, decreases monotonously by a law close to c = c_{0}t/t_{0}.

This evolution continues until ξ ≈1 and formulas eq. 52 and eq. 53 are no longer applicable. Its time duration corresponds to change of t from t_{0} to the value t_{1}, related to ξ_{0} according to

$A^2\xi_0=\ln \frac{t_0}{t_1}.$	eq. 56

The relationship between ξ and t during this time can be presented in the form

$\frac{\xi}{\xi_0}=\frac{\ln \tfrac{t}{t_1}}{\ln \tfrac{t_0}{t_1}}.$	eq. 57

After that, as seen from eq. 55, the decreasing function c starts to increase while functions a and b start to decrease. This Kasner epoch continues until terms c^{2}/a^{2}b^{2} in eq. 22 become ~ t^{2} and a next series of oscillations begins.

The law for density change during the long era under discussion is obtained by substitution of eq. 52 in eq. 20:

$\varepsilon \sim \left(\frac{\xi_0}{\xi}\right)^2.$	eq. 58

When ξ changes from ξ_{0} to ξ ≈1, the density increases $\xi^2_0$ times.

It must be stressed that although the function c(t) changes by a law, close to c ~ t, the metric eq. 52 does not correspond to a Kasner metric with powers (0, 0, 1). The latter corresponds to an exact solution found by Taub which is allowed by eqs. 26–27 and in which

$a^2=b^2=\frac{p}{2}\frac{\mathrm{ch}(2p\tau+\delta_1)}{\mathrm{ch}^2(p\tau+\delta_2)}, \; c^2=\frac{2p}{\mathrm{ch}(2p\tau+\delta_1)},$	eq. 59

where p, δ_{1}, δ_{2} are constant. In the asymptotic region τ → −∞, one can obtain from here a = b = const, c = const.t after the substitution е^{рτ} = t. In this metric, the singularity at t = 0 is non-physical.

Let us now describe the analogous study of the Type VIII model, substituting in eqs. eqs. 26–28 λ = −1, μ = ν = 1.

If during the long era, the monotonically decreasing function is a, nothing changes in the foregoing analysis: ignoring a^{2} on the right side of equations 26 and 28, goes back to the same equations 49 and 50 (with altered notation). Some changes occur, however, if the monotonically decreasing function is b or c; let it be c.

As before, one has equation 49 with the same symbols, and, therefore, the former expressions eq. 52 for the functions a(ξ) and b(ξ), but equation 50 is replaced by

$\gamma_{\xi} = -\frac{1}{4}\xi+\frac{1}{8}\xi\left (2\chi_{\xi}^2 + \mathrm{ch}2\chi + 1\right ).$	eq. 60

The major term at large ξ now becomes

$$\gamma_{\xi} \approx \frac{1}{8}\xi \cdot 2, \quad \gamma \approx \frac{1}{8} \left (\xi^2-\xi_0^2 \right ),$$

so that

$\frac{c}{c_0}=\frac{t}{t_0}=e^{-\frac{1}{8}\left (\xi_0^2-\xi^2 \right )}.$	eq. 61

The value of c as a function of time t is again c = c_{0}t/t_{0} but the time dependence of ξ changes. The length of a long era depends on ξ_{0} according to

$\xi_0 = \sqrt{8\ln \frac{t}{t_0}}.$	eq. 62

On the other hand, the value ξ_{0} determines the number of oscillations of the functions a and b during an era (equal to ξ_{0}/2π). Given the length of an era in logarithmic time (i.e., with given ratio t_{0}/t_{1}) the number of oscillations for Type VIII will be, generally speaking, less than for Type IX. For the period of oscillations one gets now Δ ln t = πξ/2; contrary to Type IX, the period is not constant throughout the long era, and slowly decreases along with ξ.

=== The small-time domain ===
Long eras violate the "regular" course of evolution which makes it difficult to study the evolution of time intervals spanning several eras. It can be shown, however, that such "abnormal" cases appear in the spontaneous evolution of the model to a singular point in the asymptotically small times t at sufficiently large distances from a start point with arbitrary initial conditions. Even in long eras both oscillatory functions during transitions between Kasner epochs remain so different that the transition occurs under the influence of only one perturbation. All results in this section relate equally to models of the types VIII and IX.

During each Kasner epoch abc = Λt, i. e. α + β + γ = ln Λ + ln t. On changing over from one epoch (with a given value of the parameter u) to the next epoch the constant Λ is multiplied by 1 + 2p_{1} = (1 – u + u^{2})/(1 + u + u^{2}) < 1. Thus a systematic decrease in Λ takes place. But it is essential that the mean (with respect to the lengths k of eras) value of the entire variation of ln Λ during an era is finite. Actually the divergence of the mean value could be due only to a too rapid increase of this variation with increasing k. For large value of the parameter u, ln(1 + 2p_{1}) ≈ −2/u. For a large k the maximal value u^{(max)} = k + x ≈ k. Hence the entire variation of ln Λ during an era is given by a sum of the form

$\sum \ln \left ( 1 + 2p_1 \right ) = \dots + \frac{1}{k-2} + \frac{1}{k-1} + \frac{1}{k}$

with only the terms that correspond to large values of u written down. When k increases this sum increases as ln k. But the probability for an appearance of an era of a large length k decreases as 1/k_{2} according to eq. 76; hence the mean value of the sum above is finite. Consequently, the systematic variation of the quantity ln Λ over a large number of eras will be proportional to this number. But it is seen in eq. 85 that with t → 0 the number s increases merely as ln |ln t|. Thus in the asymptotic limit of arbitrarily small t the term ln Λ can indeed be neglected as compared to ln t. In this approximation (Note: Since a, b, c have the dimension of length, their logarithms are defined only up to an additive constant which depends on the choice of the length units; in this sense eq. 63 has a conditional meaning corresponding to a certain choice of the zero value of α, β, γ.)

$\alpha + \beta + \gamma = -\Omega,\,$	eq. 63

where Ω denotes the "logarithmic time"

$\Omega = -\ln t.\,$	eq. 64

and the process of epoch transitions can be regarded as a series of brief time flashes. The magnitudes of maxima of the oscillating scale functions are also subject to a systematic variation. From eq. 39 for u ≫ 1 it follows that $a_{\max}^\prime - a_{\max} \approx -1/2 u$. In the same way as it was done above for the quantity ln Λ, one can hence deduce that the mean decrease in the height of the maxima during an era is finite and the total decrease over a large number of eras increases with t → 0 merely as ln Ω. At the same time the lowering of the minima, and by the same token the increase of the amplitude of the oscillations, proceed (eq. 77) proportional to Ω. In correspondence with the adopted approximation the lowering of the maxima is neglected in comparison with the increase of the amplitudes so α_{max} = 0, β_{max} = 0, γ_{max} = 0 for the maximal values of all oscillating functions and the quantities α, β, γ run only through negative values that are connected with one another at each instant of time by the relation eq. 63.

Variation of α, β, and γ as functions of the logarithmic time Ω during one era. The vertical dash lines denote alterations of the Kasner epochs, corresponding to the linear segments of the curves. On the top are indicated the values of the parameter u that determine the Kasner exponents. The last epoch has a longer duration if x is small. In the first epoch of the next era, γ begins to increase and α becomes a monotonically decreasing function.

Considering such instant change of epochs, the transition periods are ignored as small in comparison to the epoch length; this condition is actually fulfilled. (Note: According to eq. 32, transitions are large with small |p_{1}| (i. e. large u) and are ≈1/|p_{1}| ~ u. But even in this case Δ_{n} ~ u_{n} |α_{n}| $\gg$ u_{n}) Replacement of α, β, and γ maxima with zeros requires that quantities ln (|p_{1}|Λ) be small in comparison with the amplitudes of oscillations of the respective functions. As mentioned above, during transitions between eras |p_{1}| values can become very small while their magnitude and probability for occurrence are not related to the oscillation amplitudes in the respective moment. Therefore, in principle, it is possible to reach so small |p_{1}| values that the above condition (zero maxima) is violated. Such drastic drop of α_{max} can lead to various special situations in which the transition between Kasner epochs by the rule eq. 37 becomes incorrect (including the situations described above). These "dangerous" situations could break the laws used for the statistical analysis below. As mentioned, however, the probability for such deviations converges asymptotically to zero; this issue will be discussed below.

Consider an era that contains k Kasner epochs with a parameter u running through the values

$u_n = k + x - 1 - n, \quad n = 0, 1, \cdots, k - 1,$	eq. 65

and let α and β are the oscillating functions during this era (Fig. 4). (Note: Fixing the limits of the era according to eq. 64 is meaningful because in such case the era contains all epochs in which the third function, γ(t) decreases monotonously. If the era is defined by the sequence of u values from k + x to 1 + x, then the monotonous decrease of γ(t) will continue during the first epoch of the next era.)

Initial moments of Kasner epochs with parameters u_{n} are Ω_{n}. In each initial moment, one of the values α or β is zero, while the other has a minimum. Values α or β in consecutive minima, that is, in moments Ω_{n} are

$\alpha_n = -\delta_n \Omega_n \,$	eq. 66

(not distinguishing minima α and β). Values δ_{n} that measure those minima in respective Ω_{n} units can run between 0 and 1. Function γ monotonously decreases during this era; according to eq. 63 its value in moment Ω_{n} is

$\gamma_n = -\Omega_n (1 - \delta_n). \,$	eq. 67

During the epoch starting at moment Ω_{n} and ending at moment Ω_{n+1} one of the functions α or β increases from −δ_{n}Ω_{n} to zero while the other decreases from 0 to −δ_{n+1}Ω_{n+1} by linear laws, respectively:

$\mathrm{const} + |p_1(u_n)|\Omega \,$ and $\mathrm{const} - p_2(u_n)\Omega \,$

resulting in the recurrence relation

$\delta_{n+1}\Omega_{n+1} = \frac{1+u_n}{u_n} \delta_n\Omega_n = \frac{1+u_0}{u_n} \delta_0\Omega_0$	eq. 68

and for the logarithmic epoch length

$\Delta_{n+1} \equiv \Omega_{n+1} - \Omega_n = \frac{f(u_n)}{u_n} \delta_n\Omega_n = \frac{f(u_n)(1+u_{n-1})}{f(u_{n-1})u_n}\Delta_n,$	eq. 69

where, for short, f(u) = 1 + u + u^{2}. The sum of n epoch lengths is obtained by the formula

$\Omega_n - \Omega_0 = \left [n(n-1) + \frac{nf(u_{n-1})}{u_{n-1}}\right ] \delta_0\Omega_0.$	eq. 70

It can be seen from eq. 68 that |α_{n+1}| > |α_{n}|, i.e., the oscillation amplitudes of functions α and β increase during the whole era although the factors δ_{n} may be small. If the minimum at the beginning of an era is deep, the next minima will not become shallower; in other words, the residue |α — β| at the moment of transition between Kasner epochs remains large. This assertion does not depend upon era length k because transitions between epochs are determined by the common rule eq. 37 also for long eras.

The last oscillation amplitude of functions α or β in a given era is related to the amplitude of the first oscillation by the relationship |α_{k−1}| = |α_{0}| (k + x) / (1 + x). Even at k's as small as several units x can be ignored in comparison to k so that the increase of α and β oscillation amplitudes becomes proportional to the era length. For functions a = e^{α} and b = e^{β} this means that if the amplitude of their oscillations in the beginning of an era was A_{0}, at the end of this era the amplitude will become $A_0^{k/(1+x)}$.

The length of Kasner epochs (in logarithmic time) also increases inside a given era; it is easy to calculate from eq. 69 that Δ_{n+1} > Δ_{n}. (Note: Epoch lengths are great in comparison to transitions between epochs. According to eq. 33 transition lengths are great at small |p_{1}| (i.e. large u) and are ∝ 1/|p_{1}| ∝ u. But even in this case Δ_{n} ∝ u_{n}|α_{n}| $\gg$ u_{n}.) The total era length is

$\Omega^\prime_0 - \Omega_0 \equiv \Omega_k - \Omega_0 = k \left ( k + x + \frac{1}{x} \right ) \delta_0\Omega_0$	eq. 71

(the term with 1/x arises from the last, k-th, epoch whose length is great at small x; cf. Fig. 2). Moment Ω_{n} when the k-th epoch of a given era ends is at the same time moment Ω'_{0} of the beginning of the next era.

In the first Kasner epoch of the new era function γ is the first to rise from the minimal value γ_{k} = − Ω_{k} (1 − δ_{k}) that it reached in the previous era; this value plays the role of a starting amplitude δ'_{0}Ω'_{0} for the new series of oscillations. It is easily obtained that:

$\delta^\prime_0 \Omega^\prime_0 = \left ( \delta_0^{-1} + k^2 + kx - 1 \right ) \delta_0 \Omega_0.$	eq. 72

It is obvious that δ'_{0}Ω'_{0} > δ_{0}Ω_{0}. Even at not very great k the amplitude increase is very significant: function c = e^{γ} begins to oscillate from amplitude $A_0 ' \sim A_0^{k^2}$. The issue about the above-mentioned "dangerous" cases of drastic lowering of the upper oscillation limit is left aside for now.

According to eq. 40 the increase in matter density during the first (k − 1) epochs is given by the formula

$$\ln \left ( \frac{\varepsilon_{n+1}}{\varepsilon_n} \right ) = 2 \left [ 1 - p_3 ( u_n ) \right ] \Delta_{n+1}.$$

For the last k epoch of a given era, at u = x < 1 the greatest power is p_{2}(x) (not p_{3}(x) ). Therefore, for the density increase over the whole era one obtains

$\ln \left ( \frac{ \varepsilon_k }{ \varepsilon_0 } \right ) \equiv \ln \left ( \frac{ \varepsilon_0 ' }{ \varepsilon_0 } \right ) = 2 (k - 1 + x ) \delta_0 \Omega_0.$	eq. 73

Therefore, even at not very great k values, $\varepsilon_0' / \varepsilon_0 \sim A_0^{2k}$. During the next era (with a length k ' ) density will increase faster because of the increased starting amplitude A_{0}': $\varepsilon_0'' / \varepsilon_0' \sim A_0'^{2k''} \sim A_0^{2k^2 k'}$, etc. These formulae illustrate the steep increase in matter density.

=== Statistical analysis near the singularity ===
The sequence of era lengths k^{(s)}, measured by the number of Kasner epochs contained in them, acquires asymptotically the character of a random process. The same pertains also to the sequence of the interchanges of the pairs of oscillating functions on going over from one era to the next (it depends on whether the numbers k^{(s)} are even or odd). A source of this stochasticity is the rule eqs. 41–42 according to which the transition from one era to the next is determined in an infinite numerical sequence of u values. This rule states, in other words, that if the entire infinite sequence begins with a certain initial value $u_\max^{(0)} = k^{(0)} + x^{(0)}$, then the lengths of the eras k^{(0)}, k^{(1)}, ..., are the numbers in the simple continued fraction expansion

$k^{(0)} + x^{(0)} = k^{(0)} + \frac{1}{k^{(1)} + \frac{1}{k^{(2)} + \dots}}.$	eq. 73a

This expansion corresponds to the mapping transformation of the interval [0, 1] onto itself by the formula Tx = {1/x}, i.e., x_{s+1} = {1/x_{s}}. This transformation belongs to the so-called expanding transformations of the interval [0, 1], i.e., transformations x → f(x) with |f′(x)| > 1. Such transformations possess the property of exponential instability: if we take initially two close points their mutual distance increases exponentially under the iterations of the transformations. It is well known that the exponential instability leads to the appearance of strong stochastic properties.

It is possible to change over to a probabilistic description of such a sequence by considering not a definite initial value x^{(0)} but the values x^{(0)} = x distributed in the interval from 0 to 1 in accordance with a certain probabilistic distributional law w_{0}(x). Then the values of x^{(s)} terminating each era will also have distributions that follow certain laws w_{s}(x). Let w_{s}(x)dx be the probability that the s-th era terminates with the value $u_\max^{(s)} = x$ lying in a specified interval dx.

The value x^{(s)} = x, which terminates the s-th era, can result from initial (for this era) values $u_\max^{(s)} = x + k$, where k = 1, 2, ...; these values of $u_\max^{(s)}$ correspond to the values x^{(s–1)} = 1/(k + x) for the preceding era. Noting this, one can write the following recurrence relation, which expresses the distribution of the probabilities w_{s}(x) in terms of the distribution w_{s–1}(x):

$w_{s}(x)dx = \sum_{k=1}^\infty w_{s-1} \left (\frac{1}{k+x} \right ) \left\vert d \frac{1}{k+x} \right\vert$

or

$w_{s}(x) = \sum_{k=1}^\infty \frac{1}{ \left (k+x \right )^{2}} w_{s-1} \left ( \frac{1}{k+x} \right ) .$	eq. 73c

If the distribution w_{s}(x) tends with increasing s to a stationary (independent of s) limiting distribution w(x), then the latter should satisfy an equation obtained from eq. 73c by dropping the indices of the functions w_{s−1}(x) and w_{s}(x). This equation has a solution

$w(x) = \frac{1}{\left (1+x \right )\ln 2}$	eq. 74

(normalized to unity and taken to the first order of x). (Note: Equation 74 was known already to Gauss, and an equation of type eq. 73c was considered in this connection by Rodion Kuzmin (see Gauss–Kuzmin distribution). Further information on the chaotic behaviour and entropy of continued fractions in Linas Vepstas. 2008. Entropy of Continued Fractions (Gauss-Kuzmin Entropy))

In order for the s-th era to have a length k, the preceding era must terminate with a number x in the interval between 1/(k + 1) and 1/k. Therefore, the probability that the era will have a length k is equal to (in the stationary limit)

$W(k) = \int\limits_{1/(k+1)}^{1/k}w(x)\, dx = \frac{1}{\ln 2} \ln \frac{( k+1 )^2}{k (k+2)} .$	eq. 75

At large values of k

$W(k) \approx \frac{1}{k^2 \ln 2}.$	eq. 76

In relating the statistical properties of the cosmological model with the ergodic properties of the transformation x_{s+1} = {1/x_{s}} an important point must be mentioned. In an infinite sequence of numbers x constructed in accordance with this rule, arbitrarily small (but never vanishing) values of x will be observed corresponding to arbitrarily large lengths k. Such cases can (by no means necessarily!) give rise to certain specific situations when the notion of eras, as of sequences of Kasner epochs interchanging each other according to the rule eq. 37, loses its meaning (although the oscillatory mode of evolution of the model still persists). Such an "anomalous" situation can be manifested, for instance, in the necessity to retain in the right-hand side of eq. 26 terms not only with one of the functions a, b, c (say, a^{4}), as is the case in the "regular" interchange of the Kasner epochs, but simultaneously with two of them (say, a^{4}, b^{4}, a^{2}b^{2}).

On emerging from an "anomalous" series of oscillations a succession of regular eras is restored. Statistical analysis of the behavior of the model which is entirely based on regular iterations of the transformations eq. 42 is corroborated by an important theorem: the probability of the appearance of anomalous cases tends asymptotically to zero as the number of iterations s → ∞ (i.e., the time t → 0) which is proved at the end of this section. The validity of this assertion is largely due to a very rapid rate of increase of the oscillation amplitudes during every era and especially in transition from one era to the next one.

The process of the relaxation of the cosmological model to the "stationary" statistical regime (with t → 0 starting from a given "initial instant") is less interesting, however, than the properties of this regime itself with due account taken for the concrete laws of the variation of the physical characteristics of the model during the successive eras.

An idea of the rate at which the stationary distribution sets in is obtained from the following example. Let the initial values x^{(0)} be distributed in a narrow interval of width δx^{(0)} about some definite number. From the recurrence relation eq. 73c (or directly from the expansion eq. 73a) it is easy to conclude that the widths of the distributions w_{s}(x) (about other definite numbers) will then be equal to

$\delta x^{(s)} \approx \delta x^{(0)} \cdot k^{(1)2} k^{(2)2} \dots k^{(s)2}$	eq. 76a

(this expression is valid only so long as it defines quantities δx^{(s)} ≪ 1).

The mean value $\bar k$, calculated from this distribution, diverges logarithmically. For a sequence, cut off at a very large, but still finite number N, one has $\bar k \sim \ln N$. The usefulness of the mean in this case is very limited because of its instability: because of the slow decrease of W(k), fluctuations in k diverge faster than its mean. A more adequate characteristic of this sequence is the probability that a randomly chosen number from it belongs to an era of length K where K is large. This probability is lnK / lnN. It is small if $1 \ll K \ll N$. In this respect one can say that a randomly chosen number from the given sequence belongs to the long era with a high probability.

It convenient to average expressions that depend simultaneously on k^{(s)} and x^{(s)}. Since both these quantities are derived from the same quantity x^{(s–1)} (which terminates the preceding era), in accordance with the formula k^{(s)} + x^{(s)} = 1/x^{(s–1)}, their statistical distributions cannot be regarded as independent. The joint distribution W_{s}(k,x)dx of both quantities can be obtained from the distribution w_{s–1}(x)dx by making in the latter the substitution x → 1/(x + k). In other words, the function W_{s}(k,x) is given by the very expression under the summation sign in the right side of eq. 73c. In the stationary limit, taking w from eq. 74, one obtains

$W(k, x) = \frac{k + x + 1}{\left (k + x \right ) \ln 2}.$	eq. 76b

Summation of this distribution over k brings us back to eq. 74, and integration with respect to dx to eq. 75.

The recurrent formulas defining transitions between eras are re-written with index s numbering the successive eras (not the Kasner epochs in a given era!), beginning from some era (s = 0) defined as initial. Ω^{(s)} and ε^{(s)} are, respectively, the initial moment and initial matter density in the s-th era; δ^{(s)}Ω^{(s)} is the initial oscillation amplitude of that pair of functions α, β, γ, which oscillates in the given era: k^{(s)} is the length of s-th era, and x^{(s)} determines the length (number of Kasner epochs) of the next era according to k^{(s+1)} = [1/x^{(s)}]. According to eqs. 71–73

$\Omega^{(s+1)} / \Omega^{(s)} = 1 + \delta^{(s)} k^{(s)} \left ( k^{(s)} + x^{(s)} + \frac{1}{x^{(s)}} \right ) \equiv \exp \xi^{(s)},$	eq. 77

$\delta^{(s+1)} = 1 - \frac{\left ( k^{(s)} / x^{(s)} + 1 \right ) \delta^{(s)}}{1 + \delta^{(s)} k^{(s)} \left ( 1 + x^{(s)} + 1 / x^{(s)} \right )},$	eq. 78

$\ln \left ( \frac{\varepsilon^{(s+1)}}{\varepsilon^{(s)}} \right ) = 2 \left ( k^{(s)} + x^{(s)} - 1 \right ) \delta^{(s)} \Omega^{(s)}$	eq. 79

(ξ^{(s)} is introduced in eq. 77 to be used further on).

The quantities δ^{(s)} have a stable stationary statistical distribution P(δ) and a stable (small relative fluctuations) mean value. For their determination KL in coauthorship with Ilya Lifshitz, the brother of Evgeny Lifshitz, used (with due reservations) an approximate method based on the assumption of statistical independence of the random quantity δ^{(s)} and of the random quantities k^{(s)}, x^{(s)}. For the function P(δ) an integral equation was set up which expressed the fact that the quantities δ^{(s+1)} and δ^{(s)} interconnected by the relation eq. 78 have the same distribution; this equation was solved numerically. In a later work, Khalatnikov et al. showed that the distribution P(δ) can actually be found exactly by an analytical method (see Fig. 5).

For the statistical properties in the stationary limit, it is reasonable to introduce the so-called natural extension of the transformation Tx = {1/x} by continuing it without limit to negative indices. Otherwise stated, this is a transition from a one-sided infinite sequence of the numbers (x_{0}, x_{1}, x_{2}, ...), connected by the equalities Tx = {1/x}, to a "doubly infinite" sequence X = (..., x_{−1}, x_{0}, x_{1}, x_{2}, ...) of the numbers which are connected by the same equalities for all –∞ < s < ∞. Of course, such expansion is not unique in the literal meaning of the word (since x_{s–1} is not determined uniquely by x_{s}), but all statistical properties of the extended sequence are uniform over its entire length, i.e., are invariant with respect to arbitrary shift (and x_{0} loses its meaning of an "initial" condition). The sequence X is equivalent to a sequence of integers K = (..., k_{−1}, k_{0}, k_{1}, k_{2}, ...), constructed by the rule k_{s} = [1/x_{s–1}]. Inversely, every number of X is determined by the integers of K as an infinite continued fraction

$x_{s} = \frac{1}{k_{s+1} + \frac{1}{k_{s+2} + \dots}} \equiv x_{s+1}^{+}$	eq. 79a

(the convenience of introducing the notation $x_{s+1}^{+}$ with an index shifted by 1 will become clear in the following). For concise notation the continuous fraction is denoted simply by enumeration (in square brackets) of its denominators; then the definition of $x_{s}^{+}$ can be written as

$x_{s}^{+} = \left [ k_{s}, k_{s+1}, \dots \right ]$	eq. 79b

Reverse quantities are defined by a continued fraction with a retrograde (in the direction of diminishing indices) sequence of denominators

$x_{s}^{-} = \left [ k_{s-1}, k_{s-2}, \dots \right ]$	eq. 79c

The recurrence relation eq. 78 is transformed by introducing temporarily the notation η_{s} = (1 − δ_{s})/δ_{s}. Then eq. 78 can be rewritten as

$\eta_{s+1} = \frac{1}{\eta_{s} x_{s-1} + k_{s}}$

By iteration an infinite continuous fraction is obtained

$\eta_{s+1} x_s = \left [ k_{s}, k_{s-1}, \dots \right ] = x_{s+1}^{-}$

Hence $\eta_{s} = x_{s}^{-} / x_{s}^{+}$ and finally

$\delta_{s} = \frac{x_{s}^{+}}{x_{s}^{+} + x_{s}^{-}}$	eq. 79d

This expression for δ_{s} contains only two (instead of the three in) random quantities $x_{s}^{+}$ and $x_{s}^{-}$, each of which assumes values in the interval [0, 1].

It follows from the definition eq. 79c that $1/x_{s}^{-} = x_{s}^{-} + k_{s} = x_{s}^{-} + \left [ 1 / x_{s}^{+} \right ]$. Hence the shift of the entire sequence X by one step to the right means a joint transformation of the quantities $x_{s}^{+}$ and $x_{s}^{-}$ according to

$x_{s+1}^{+} = \frac{1}{x_{s}^{+}}, \quad x_{s+1}^{-} = \frac{1}{\frac{1}{x_{s}^{+}} + x_{s}^{-}}$	eq. 79e

This is a one-to-one mapping in the unit square. Thus we have now a one-to-one transformation of two quantities instead of a not one-to-one transformation Tx = {1/x} of one quantity.

The quantities $x_{s}^{+}$ and $x_{s}^{-}$ have a joint stationary distribution P(x^{+}, x^{−}). Since eq. 79e is a one-to-one transformation, the condition for the distribution to be stationary is expressed simply by a function equation

$P \left (x_{s}^{+}, x_{s}^{-} \right ) = P \left (x_{s+1}^{+}, x_{s+1}^{-} \right ) J$	eq. 79f

where J is the Jacobian of the transformation.

A shift of the sequence X by one step gives rise to the following transformation T of the unit square:

$x^{\prime} = \frac{1}{x}, \quad y^{\prime} = \frac{1}{\frac{1}{x} + y}$

(with $x \equiv x_0^{+}$, $y \equiv x_0^{-}$, cf. eq. 79e). The density P(x, y) defines the invariant measure for this transformation. It is natural to suppose that P(x, y) is a symmetric function of x and y. This means that the measure is invariant with respect to the transformation S(x, y) = (y, x) and hence with respect to the product ST with ST(x, y) = (x″, y″) and

$x'' = \frac{1}{\frac{1}{x} + y}, \quad y'' = \frac{1}{x}$

Evidently ST has a first integral H = 1/x + y. On the line H = const ≡ c the transformation has the form

$\frac{1}{x''} = \left [ \frac{1}{x} \right ] + y = \left [ \frac{1}{x} \right ] + c - \frac{1}{x} = c - \left \{ \frac{1}{x} \right \}$

Hence the invariant measure density of ST must be of the form

$f(c)\ dc\ d \frac{1}{x} = f \left ( \frac{1}{x} + y \right ) \frac{1}{x^2} dx\ dy$

Accounting for the symmetry P(x, y)= P(y, x), this becomes f(c)= c^{−2} and hence (after normalization)

$P \left ( x_{s}^{+}, x_{s}^{-} \right ) = \frac{1}{\left ( 1+x^{+}x^{-} \right )^2 \ln 2}$	eq. 79g

(its integration over x^{+} or x^{–} yields the function w(x) eq. 74). The reduction of the transformation to one-to-one mapping was used already by Chernoff and Barrow and they obtained a formula of the form of eq. 79g but for other variables; their paper does not contain applications to the problems which are considered in Khalatnikov et al.

The correctness of eq. 79g be verified also by a direct calculation; the Jacobian of the transformation eq. 79e is

$J = \frac{\partial \left ( x_{s+1}^{+}, x_{s+1}^{-} \right )}{\partial \left ( x_{s}^{+}, x_{s}^{-} \right )} = \frac{\partial x_{s+1}^{+}}{\partial x_{s}^{+}} \frac{\partial x_{s+1}^{-}}{\partial x_{s}^{-}} = \left ( \frac{x_{s+1}^{+}} {x_{s}^{+}} \right )^2$

(in its calculation one must note that $\left [ 1/x_{s}^{+} \right ] + \left \{ 1/x_{s}^{+} \right \} = 1/x_{s}^{+}$).

The probability distribution function P(δ). Red line: exact function eq. 79h. Blue line: approximate solution of the integral equation in. Both curves appear to be strikingly similar and the means of both distributions are 0.50. (Note: The plot of the function P(δ) in Fig. 2 in Lifshitz, Lifshitz & Khalatnikov 1970 is incorrect for several reasons. Apparently some errors were admitted in preparing the program for numerical solution of the integral equation. Also a "forced" reduction of the values P(0) and P(1) was performed in view of the incorrect footnote in Lifshitz, Lifshitz & Khalatnikov 1970, Sec. 4. The finite probability of the value δ = 0 does not mean the possibility of the initial amplitude of oscillation becoming zero (which would be in contradiction to the regular course of evolution shown in Fig. 4). From eq. 78 δ_{s+1} tends to zero with x_{s} → 0 proportional to x_{s}; but the amplitude is given by the product δ_{s+1}Ω_{s+1}, which tends to a finite limit since the expression eq. 77 contains a term with 1/x_{s}.)

Since by eq. 79d δ_{s} is expressed in terms of the random quantities x^{+} and x^{−}, the knowledge of their joint distribution makes it possible to calculate the statistical distribution P(δ) by integrating P(x^{+}, x^{−}) over one of the variables at a constant value of δ. Due to symmetry of the function eq. 79g with respect to the variables x^{+} and x^{−}, P(δ) = P(1 − δ), i.e., the function P(δ) is symmetrical with respect to the point δ = 1/2. Then

$P(\delta)\ d\delta = d\delta \int_0^1 P \left ( x^{+}, \frac{x^{+} \delta}{1 - \delta} \right ) \left ( \frac{\partial x^{-}}{\partial \delta} \right )_{x^{+}} d x^{+}$

On evaluating this integral (for 0 ≤ δ ≤ 1/2 and then making use of the aforementioned symmetry), finally

$P(\delta) = \frac{1}{\left (|1 - 2 \delta| + 1 \right ) \ln 2}$	eq. 79h

The mean value $\bar{\delta}$= 1/2 already as a result of the symmetry of the function P(δ). Thus the mean value of the initial (in every era) amplitude of oscillations of the functions α, β, γ increases as Ω/2.

The statistical relation between large time intervals Ω and the number of eras s contained in them is found by repeated application of eq. 77:

$\frac{\Omega^{(s)}}{\Omega^{(0)}} = \exp \left ( \sum_{p=0}^{s-1} \xi^{(p)} \right ).$	eq. 80

Direct averaging of this equation, however, does not make sense: because of the slow decrease of function W(k) eq. 76, the average values of the quantity exp ξ^{(s)} are unstable in the above sense – the fluctuations increase even more rapidly than the mean value itself with increasing region of averaging. This instability is eliminated by taking the logarithm: the "doubly-logarithmic" time interval

$\tau_s \equiv \ln \left ( \frac{\Omega^{(s)}}{\Omega^{(0)}} \right ) = \ln | \ln t_s | - \ln | \ln t_0 | = \sum_{p=0}^{s-1} \xi^{(p)}$	eq. 81

is expressed by the sum of quantities ξ^{(p)} which have a stable statistical distribution. The mean value of τ is $\bar{\tau} = s \bar{\xi}$. To calculate $\bar{\xi}$ note that eq. 77 can be rewritten as

$\xi_s = \ln \frac{\left ( k_s + x_s \right ) \delta_s} {x_s \left (1 - \delta_{s+1} \right )} = \ln \frac{\delta_s} {x_s x_{s-1} \left ( 1 - \delta_{s+1} \right )}$	eq. 81a

For the stationary distribution $\overline{\ln x_s} = \overline{\ln x_{s-1}}$, and in virtue of the symmetry of the function P(δ) also $\overline{\ln \delta_s} = \overline{\ln \left ( \delta_{s+1} \right )}$. Hence

$\bar{\xi} = -2 \overline{\ln x} = -2 \int_0^1 w (x) \ln x\ dx = \frac{\pi^2}{6 \ln 2} = 2.37$

(w(x) from eq. 74). Thus

$\overline{\tau_s} = 2.37s,$	eq. 82

which determines the mean doubly-logarithmic time interval containing s successive eras.

For large s the number of terms in the sum eq. 81 is large and according to general theorems of the ergodic theory the values of τ_{s} are distributed around $\overline{\tau_s}$ according to Gauss's law with the density

$\rho (\tau_s) = \left ( 2 \pi D_{\tau} \right )^{-1/2} \exp \left [ - \left ( \tau_s - \overline{\tau_s} \right )^2 / 2 D_{\tau} \right ]$	eq. 82a

Calculation of the variance D_{τ} is more complicated since not only the knowledge of $\bar{\xi}$ and $\overline{\xi^2}$ are needed but also of the correlations $\overline{\xi_p \xi_{p \prime}}$. The calculation can be simplified by rearranging the terms in the sum eq. 81. By using eq. 81a the sum can be rewritten as

$\sum_{p=1}^s \xi_p = \ln \prod_{p=1}^s \frac{\delta_p}{\left (1 - \delta_{p+1} \right ) x_p x_{p-1}} = \ln \prod_{p=1}^s \frac{\delta_p}{\left (1 - \delta_{p} \right ) x_{p-1}^2} + \ln \frac{x_0}{x_s} + \ln \frac{1 - \delta_1}{1 - \delta_{s+1}}$

The last two terms do not increase with increasing s; these terms can be omitted as the limiting laws for large s are dominating. Then

$\sum_{p=1}^s \xi_p = \sum_{p=1}^s \ln \frac{x_p^{-}}{x_p^{+}}$	eq. 82b

(the expression eq. 79d for δ_{p} is taken into account). To the same accuracy (i.e., up to the terms which do not increase with s) the equality

$\sum_{p=1}^s \xi_p^{+} = \sum_{p=1}^s \xi_p^{-}$	eq. 82c

is valid. Indeed, in virtue of eq. 79e

$x_{p+1}^{+} + \frac{1}{x_{p+1}^{-}} = \frac{1}{x_p^{+}} + x_p^{-}$

and hence

$\ln \left ( 1 + x_{p+1}^{+} x_{p+1}^{-} \right ) - \ln x_{p+1}^{-} = \ln \left ( 1 + x_{p}^{+} x_{p}^{-} \right ) - \ln x_{p}^{+}$

By summing this identity over p eq. 82c is obtained. Finally again with the same accuracy $x_p^{+}$ is changed for x_{p} under the summation sign and thus represent τ_{s} as

$\tau_s = \sum_{p=1}^{\infty} \eta_p, \quad \eta_p = -2 \ln x_p$	eq. 83

The variance of this sum in the limit of large s is

$D_{{\tau}_s} = \overline{ \left (\tau_s - \overline{\tau_s} \right )^2} \approx s \left \{ \overline{\eta^2} - \bar{\eta}^2 + 2 \sum_{p=1}^{\infty} \left ( \overline{\eta_0 \eta_p} - \bar{\eta}^2 \right ) \right \}$	eq. 84

It is taken into account that in virtue of the statistical homogeneity of the sequence X the correlations $\overline{\eta_p \eta_{p \prime}}$ depend only on the differences |p − p′|. The mean value $\bar{\eta} = \bar{\xi}$; the mean square

$\overline{\eta^2} = 4 \int_0^1 w(x) \ln^2 x\ dx = \frac{6 \xi (3)}{\ln 2} = 10.40$

By taking into account also the values of correlations $\overline{\eta_0 \eta_p}$ with p = 1, 2, 3 (calculated numerically) the final result D_{τ_{s}} = (3.5 ± 0.1)s is obtained.

At increasing s the relative fluctuation $D_{{\tau}_s} / \overline{\tau_s}$ tends to zero as s^{−1/2}. In other words, the statistical relation eq. 82 becomes almost certain at large s. This makes it possible to invert the relation, i.e., to represent it as the dependence of the average number of the eras s_{τ} that are interchanged in a given interval τ of the double logarithmic time:

$\overline{s_{\tau}} = 0.47\tau.$	eq. 85

The statistical distribution of the exact values of s_{τ} around its average is also Gaussian with the variance

$D_{s_{\tau}} = 3.5 \frac{\overline{s_{\tau}}^3}{\tau^2} = 0.26 \tau$

The respective statistical distribution is given by the same Gaussian distribution in which the random variable is now s_{τ} at a given τ:

$\rho(s_\tau) \propto \exp \left \{ - \left ( s_\tau - 0.47\tau \right )^2/0.43\tau \right \}.$	eq. 86

From this point of view, the source of the statistical behavior is the arbitrariness in the choice of the starting point of the interval τ superimposed on the infinite sequence of the interchanging eras.

Respective to matter density, eq. 79 can be re-written with account of eq. 80 in the form

$$\ln \ln \frac{\varepsilon^{(s+1)}}{\varepsilon^{(s)}} = \eta_s + \sum_{p=0}^{s-1} \xi_p, \quad \eta_s = \ln \left [ 2\delta^{(s)} \left ( k^{(s)} + x^{(s)} - 1 \right ) \Omega^{(0)} \right ]$$

and then, for the total energy change during s eras,

$\ln \ln \frac{\varepsilon^{(s)}}{\varepsilon^{(0)}} = \ln \sum_{p=0}^{s-1} \exp \left \{ \sum_{q=0}^p\xi_q + \eta_p \right \}.$	eq. 87

The term with the sum by p gives the main contribution to this expression because it contains an exponent with a large power. Leaving only this term and averaging eq. 87, one gets in its right hand side the expression $s\bar{\xi}$ which coincides with eq. 82; all other terms in the sum (also terms with η_{s} in their powers) lead only to corrections of a relative order 1/s. Therefore,

$\overline{\ln \ln \left (\frac{\varepsilon^{(s)}}{\varepsilon^{(0)}} \right )} = \overline{\ln \left ( \frac{\Omega^{(s)}}{\Omega^{(0)}} \right )}.$	eq. 88

By virtue of the almost certain character of the relation between τ_{s} and s eq. 88 can be written as

$$\overline{\ln \ln \left ( \varepsilon_\tau/\varepsilon^{(0)} \right )} = \tau \quad \text{or} \quad \overline{\ln \ln \left ( \varepsilon^{(s)}/\varepsilon^{(0)} \right )} = 2.1 s,$$

which determines the value of the double logarithm of density increase averaged by given double-logarithmic time intervals τ or by a given number of eras s.

These stable statistical relationships exist specifically for doubly-logarithmic time intervals and for the density increase. For other characteristics, e.g., ln (ε^{(s)}/ε^{(0)}) or Ω^{(s)} / Ω^{(0)} = exp τ_{s} the relative fluctuation increase exponentially with the increase of the averaging range thereby voiding the term mean value of a stable meaning.

The origin of the statistical relationship eq. 88 can be traced already from the initial law governing the variation of the density during the individual Kasner epochs. According to eq. 21, during the entire evolution we have

$\ln \ln \varepsilon (t) = \text{const} + \ln \Omega + \ln 2 (1 - p_3 (t)),$

with 1 − p_{3}(t) changing from epoch to epoch, running through values in the interval from 0 to 1. The term ln Ω = ln ln (1/t) increases monotonically; on the other hand, the term ln2(1 − p_{3}) can assume large values (comparable with ln Ω) only when values of p_{3} very close to unity appear (i.e., very small |p_{1}|). These are precisely the "dangerous" cases that disturb the regular course of evolution expressed by the recurrent relationships eq. 77–eq. 79.

It remains to show that such cases actually do not arise in the asymptotic limiting regime. The spontaneous evolution of the model starts at a certain instant at which definite initial conditions are specified in an arbitrary manner. Accordingly, by "asymptotic" is meant a regime sufficiently far away from the chosen initial instant.

Dangerous cases are those in which excessively small values of the parameter u = x (and hence also |p_{1}| ≈ x) appear at the end of an era. A criterion for selection of such cases is the inequality

$x^{(s)} \exp \left | \alpha^{(s)} \right | \lesssim 1,$	eq. 89

where | α^{(s)} | is the initial minima depth of the functions that oscillate in era s (it would be more appropriate to choose the final amplitude, but that would only strengthen the selection criterion).

The value of x^{(0)} in the first era is determined by the initial conditions. Dangerous are values in the interval δx^{(0)} ~ exp ( − |α^{(0)}| ), and also in intervals that could result in dangerous cases in the next eras. In order for x^{(s)} to fall in the dangerous interval δx^{(s)} ~ exp ( − | α^{(s)} | ), the initial value x^{(0)} should lie into an interval of a width δx^{(0)} ~ δx^{(s)} / k^{(1)^2} ... k^{(s)^2}. Therefore, from a unit interval of all possible values of x^{(0)}, dangerous cases will appear in parts λ of this interval:

$\lambda = \exp \left ( \left |-\alpha^{(s)} \right | \right ) + \sum_{s=1}^\infty \sum_k \frac{\exp \left ( \left |-\alpha^{(s)} \right | \right )}{k^{(1)^2} k^{(2)^2} \dots k^{(s)^2}}$	eq. 90

(the inner sum is taken over all the values k^{(1)}, k^{(2)}, ... , k^{(s)} from 1 to ∞). It is easy to show that this era converges to the value λ $\ll$ 1 whose order of magnitude is determined by the first term in eq. 90. This can be shown by a strong majoration of the era for which one substitutes | α^{(s)} | = (s + 1) | α^{(0)} |, regardless of the lengths of eras k^{(1)}, k^{(2)}, ... (In fact | α^{(s)} | increase much faster; even in the most unfavorable case k^{(1)} = k^{(2)} = ... = 1 values of | α^{(s)} | increase as q^{s} | α^{(0)} | with q > 1.) Noting that

$$\sum_k \frac{1}{k^{(1)^2} k^{(2)^2} \dots k^{(s)^2}} = \left ( \pi^2 / 6 \right )^s$$

one obtains

$$\lambda = \exp \left ( \left |-\alpha^{(0)} \right | \right )\sum_{s=0}^\infty \left [ \left ( \pi^2 / 6 \right ) \exp \left ( \left |-\alpha^{(0)} \right | \right ) \right ]^s \approx \exp \left ( \left |-\alpha^{(0)} \right | \right ).$$

If the initial value of x^{(0)} lies outside the dangerous region λ there will be no dangerous cases. If it lies inside this region dangerous cases occur, but upon their completion the model resumes a "regular" evolution with a new initial value which only occasionally (with a probability λ) may come into the dangerous interval. Repeated dangerous cases occur with probabilities λ^{2}, λ^{3}, ... , asymptotically converging to zero.

== General solution with small oscillations ==
In the above models, metric evolution near the singularity is studied on the example of homogeneous space metrics. It is clear from the characteristic of this evolution that the analytic construction of the general solution for a singularity of such type should be made separately for each of the basic evolution components: for the Kasner epochs, for the process of transitions between epochs caused by "perturbations", for long eras with two perturbations acting simultaneously. During a Kasner epoch (i.e. at small perturbations), the metric is given by eq. 7 without the condition λ = 0.

BKL further developed a matter distribution-independent model (homogeneous or non-homogeneous) for long era with small oscillations. The time dependence of this solution turns out to be very similar to that in the particular case of homogeneous models; the latter can be obtained from the distribution-independent model by a special choice of the arbitrary functions contained in it.

It is convenient, however, to construct the general solution in a system of coordinates somewhat different from synchronous reference frame: g_{0α} = 0 as in the synchronous frame, but instead of g_{00} = 1 it is now g_{00} = −g_{33}. Defining again the space metric tensor γ_{αβ} = −g_{αβ} one has, therefore

$g_{00} = \gamma_{33}, \quad g_{0\alpha} = 0.$	eq. 91

The special space coordinate is written as x^{3} = z and the time coordinate is written as x^{0} = ξ (as different from proper time t); it will be shown that ξ corresponds to the same variable defined in homogeneous models. Differentiation by ξ and z is designated, respectively, by dot and prime. Latin indices a, b, c take values 1, 2, corresponding to space coordinates x^{1}, x^{2} which will be also written as x, y. Therefore, the metric is

$ds^2 = \gamma_{33} \left ( d\xi^2 - dz^2 \right ) - \gamma_{ab}dx^adx^b - 2\gamma_{a3}dx^adz.$	eq. 92

The required solution should satisfy the inequalities

$\gamma_{33} \ll \gamma_{ab},$	eq. 93

$\gamma_{a3}^2 \ll \gamma_{aa}\gamma_{33}$	eq. 94

(these conditions specify that one of the functions a^{2}, b^{2}, c^{2} is small compared to the other two which was also the case with homogeneous models).

Inequality eq. 94 means that components γ_{a3} are small in the sense that at any ratio of the shifts dx^{a} and dz, terms with products dx^{a}dz can be omitted in the square of the spatial length element dl^{2}. Therefore, the first approximation to a solution is a metric eq. 92 with γ_{a3} = 0: (Note: Note that this metric allows arbitrary transformations of type ξ′ + z″ = f_{1} (ξ + z), ξ′ − z′ = f_{2} (ξ − z), x′^{a} = f^{a} (x^{1}, x^{2}).)

$ds^2 = \gamma_{33} \left ( d\xi^2 - dz^2 \right ) - \gamma_{ab}dx^adx^b.$	eq. 95

One can be easily convinced by calculating the Ricci tensor components $R_0^0$, $R_3^0$, $R_3^3$, $R_a^b$ using metric eq. 95 and the condition eq. 93 that all terms containing derivatives by coordinates x^{a} are small compared to terms with derivatives by ξ and z (their ratio is ~ γ_{33} / γ_{ab}). In other words, to obtain the equations of the main approximation, γ_{33} and γ_{ab} in eq. 95 should be differentiated as if they do not depend on x^{a}. Designating

$\gamma_{33} = e^\psi, \quad \dot{\gamma}_{ab} = \varkappa_{ab}, \quad \gamma_{ab}^\prime = \lambda_{ab}, \quad |\gamma_{ab}| = G^2,$	eq. 96

one obtains the following equations: (Note: The equation $R_0^0 + R_3^3 = 0$ is a direct result of eq. 97–eq. 99 if $\dot G \neq 0$ or $G^\prime \neq 0$. The case $\dot G = G^\prime = 0$ does not require a special treatment: it can be shown that the spacetime metric in this case converges (in first approximation) to Galilean.)

$2e^\psi R_a^b = G^{-1} \left ( G \lambda_a^b \right )^\prime-G^{-1} \left ( G \varkappa_a^b \right )\dot{ } = 0,$	eq. 97

$2e^\psi R_3^0 = \frac{1}{2}\varkappa\psi^\prime + \frac{1}{2}\lambda\dot{\psi} - \varkappa^\prime -\frac{1}{2}\varkappa_a^b\lambda_b^a = 0,$	eq. 98

$2e^\psi ( R_0^0 - R_3^3 ) = \lambda\psi^\prime + \varkappa\dot{\psi} - \dot \varkappa - \lambda^\prime - \frac{1}{2}\varkappa_a^b\varkappa_b^a - \frac{1}{2}\lambda_a^b\lambda_b^a = 0.$	eq. 99

Index raising and lowering is done here with the help of γ_{ab}. The quantities $\varkappa$ and λ are the contractions $\varkappa_a^a$ and $\lambda_a^a$ whereby

$\varkappa = 2\dot G / G, \quad \lambda = 2G^\prime / G.$	eq. 100

As to the Ricci tensor components $R_a^0$, $R_a^3$, by this calculation they are identically zero. In the next approximation (i.e., with account to small γ_{a3} and derivatives by x, y), they determine the quantities γ_{a3} by already known γ_{33} and γ_{ab}.

Contraction of eq. 97 gives $G^{\prime\prime} + \ddot G = 0$, and, hence,

$G = f_1 ( x, y, \xi + z ) + f_2 ( x, y, \xi - z ).$	eq. 101

Different cases are possible depending on the G variable. In the above case g^{00} = γ^{33} $\gg$ γ^{ab} and $N \approx g^{00} \left ( \dot G \right )^2 - \gamma^{33} \left ( G^\prime \right )^2 = 4 \gamma^{33} \dot{f}_1 \dot{f}_2$. The case N > 0 (quantity N is time-like) leads to time singularities of interest. Substituting in eq. 101 f_{1} = 1/2 (ξ + z) sin y, f_{2} = 1/2 (ξ − z) sin y results in G of type

$G = \xi \sin y.\,$	eq. 102

This choice does not diminish the generality of conclusions; it can be shown that generality is possible (in the first approximation) just on account of the remaining permissible transformations of variables. At N < 0 (quantity N is space-like) one can substitute G = z which generalizes the well-known Einstein–Rosen metric. At N = 0 one arrives at the Robinson–Bondi wave metric that depends only on ξ + z or only on ξ − z (cf.). The factor sin y in eq. 102 is put for convenient comparison with homogeneous models. Taking into account eq. 102, equations eq. 97 – eq. 99 become

$\dot{\varkappa}_a^b + \xi^{-1} \varkappa_a^b - {\lambda_a^b}^\prime = 0,$	eq. 103

$\dot{\psi} = -\xi^{-1} + \frac{1}{4}\xi \left ( \varkappa_a^b\varkappa_b^a + \lambda_a^b\lambda_b^a \right ).$	eq. 104

$\psi^\prime = \frac{1}{2}\xi_a^b \lambda_b^a.$	eq. 105

The principal equations are eq. 103 defining the γ_{ab} components; then, function ψ is found by a simple integration of eq. 104–eq. 105.

The variable ξ runs through the values from 0 to ∞. The solution of eq. 103 is considered at two boundaries, ξ $\gg$ 1 and $\ll$ 1. At large ξ values, one can look for a solution that takes the form of a 1 / √ξ decomposition:

$\gamma_{ab} = \xi \left [ a_{ab} (x,y,z)+O(1/\sqrt{\xi}) \right ],$	eq. 106

whereby

$|a_{ab}| = \sin^2 y \,$	eq. 107

(equation 107 needs condition 102 to be true). Substituting eq. 103 in eq. 106, one obtains in the first order

${\left ( {a^{ac}}^\prime a_{bc} \right )}^\prime = 0,$	eq. 108

where quantities a^{ac} constitute a matrix that is inverse to matrix a_{ac}. The solution of eq. 108 has the form

$a_{ab} = l_a l_b e^{-2\rho z}+m_a m_b e^{2\rho z},$	eq. 109

$l_1 m_2 + l_2 m_1 = \sin y,$	eq. 110

where l_{a}, m_{a}, ρ, are arbitrary functions of coordinates x, y bound by condition eq. 110 derived from eq. 107.

To find higher terms of this decomposition, it is convenient to write the matrix of required quantities γ_{ab} in the form

$\gamma_{ab} = \xi \left ( \tilde L e^H L \right )_{ab},$	eq. 111

$$L = \begin{bmatrix} l_1 e^{-\rho z} & l_2 e^{-\rho z} \\ m_1 e^{\rho z} & m_2 e^{\rho z} \end{bmatrix},$$	eq. 112

where the symbol ~ means matrix transposition. Matrix H is symmetric and its trace is zero. Presentation eq. 111 ensures symmetry of γ_{ab} and fulfillment of condition eq. 102. If exp H is substituted with 1, one obtains from eq. 111 γ_{ab} = ξa_{ab} with a_{ab} from eq. 109. In other words, the first term of γ_{ab} decomposition corresponds to H = 0; higher terms are obtained by powers decomposition of matrix H whose components are considered small.

The independent components of matrix H are written as σ and φ so that

$$H = \begin{bmatrix} \sigma & \varphi \\ \varphi & -\sigma \end{bmatrix}.$$	eq. 113

Substituting eq. 111 in eq. 103 and leaving only terms linear by H, one derives for σ and φ

$$\ddot{\sigma}+\xi^{-1}\dot{\sigma}-\sigma^{\prime\prime}=0,$$

$\ddot{\varphi}+\xi^{-1}\dot{\varphi}-\varphi^{\prime\prime}+4\rho^2 \varphi = 0.$	eq. 114

If one tries to find a solution to these equations as Fourier series by the z coordinate, then for the series coefficients, as functions of ξ, one obtains Bessel equations. The major asymptotic terms of the solution at large ξ are (Note: It is possible to look for a solution in the form of Fourier integrals; this issue has not been studied in detail. Therefore, BKL do not require Fourier series decomposition as a mandatory condition for the coordinate dependence of functions σ and φ)

$$\sigma = \frac{1}{\sqrt{\xi}}\sum_{n=-\infty}^\infty \left ( A_{1n} e^{in\omega\xi}+B_{1n} e^{-in\omega\xi} \right ) e^{in\omega z},$$

$\varphi = \frac{1}{\sqrt{\xi}}\sum_{n=-\infty}^\infty \left ( A_{2n} e^{in\omega\xi}+B_{2n} e^{-in\omega\xi} \right ) e^{in\omega z},$	eq. 115

$$\omega_n^2 = n^2\omega^2+4\rho^2.$$

Coefficients A and B are arbitrary complex functions of coordinates x, y and satisfy the necessary conditions for real σ and φ; the base frequency ω is an arbitrary real function of x, y. Now from eq. 104–eq. 105 it is easy to obtain the first term of the function ψ:

$\psi = \rho^2\xi^2 \,$	eq. 116

(this term vanishes if ρ = 0; in this case the major term is the one linear for ξ from the decomposition: ψ = ξq (x, y) where q is a positive function).

Therefore, at large ξ values, the components of the metric tensor γ_{ab} oscillate upon decreasing ξ on the background of a slow decrease caused by the decreasing ξ factor in eq. 111. The component γ_{33} = e^{ψ} decreases quickly by a law close to exp (ρ^{2}ξ^{2}); this makes it possible for condition eq. 93. (Note: Squared H terms in eq. 103 result only in small (≈1/ξ) corrections in σ and φ. Calculation with cubic terms leads to appearance of a weak dependence of A, B from ξ that can be presented as an appearance of logarithmic phases in the oscillating factors in eq. 115. These calculations for the case ρ = 0 are given in Belinsky & Khalatnikov (1970, Appendix B) (cf. the analogous situation for homogeneous models, Belinsky, Khalatnikov & Lifshitz (1970, Appendix B)).)

Next BKL consider the case ξ $\ll$ 1. The first approximation to a solution of eq. 103 is found by the assumption (confirmed by the result) that in these equations terms with derivatives by coordinates can be left out:

$\dot{\varkappa}_a^b+\xi^{-1} \varkappa_a^b = 0.$	eq. 117

This equation together with the condition eq. 102 gives

$\gamma_{ab} = \lambda_a \lambda_b \xi^{2 s_1} + \mu_a \mu_b \xi^{2 s_2}, \,$	eq. 118

where λ_{a}, μ_{a}, s_{1}, s_{2} are arbitrary functions of all 3 coordinates x, y, z, which are related with other conditions

$\lambda_1 \mu_2 - \lambda_2 \mu_1 = \sin y, \quad s_1 + s_2 = 1. \,$	eq. 119

Equations eq. 104–eq. 105 give now

$\gamma_{33} = e^\psi \sim \xi^{-(1-s_1^2-s_2^2)}. \,$	eq. 120

The derivatives ${\lambda_a^b}^\prime$, calculated by eq. 118, contain terms ~ ξ^{4s_{1} − 2} and ~ ξ^{4s_{2} − 2} while terms left in eq. 117 are ~ ξ^{−2}. Therefore, application of eq. 103 instead of eq. 117 is permitted on conditions s_{1} > 0, s_{2} > 0; hence 1 − $s_1^2 - s_2^2$ > 0.

Thus, at small ξ oscillations of functions γ_{ab} cease while function γ_{33} begins to increase at decreasing ξ. This is a Kasner mode and when γ_{33} is compared to γ_{ab}, the above approximation is not applicable.

In order to check the compatibility of this analysis, BKL studied the equations $R_{\alpha}^0$ = 0, $R_{\alpha}^3$ = 0, and, calculating from them the components γ_{a3}, confirmed that the inequality eq. 94 takes place. This study showed that in both asymptotic regions the components γ_{a3} were ~ γ_{33}. Therefore, correctness of inequality eq. 93 immediately implies correctness of inequality eq. 94.

This solution contains, as it should for the general case of a field in vacuum, four arbitrary functions of the three space coordinates x, y, z. In the region ξ $\ll$ 1 these functions are, e.g., λ_{1}, λ_{2}, μ_{1}, s_{1}. In the region ξ $\gg$ 1 the four functions are defined by the Fourier series by coordinate z from eq. 115 with coefficients that are functions of x, y; although Fourier series decomposition (or integral?) characterizes a special class of functions, this class is large enough to encompass any finite subset of the set of all possible initial conditions.

The solution contains also a number of other arbitrary functions of the coordinates x, y. Such two-dimensional arbitrary functions appear, generally speaking, because the relationships between three-dimensional functions in the solutions of the Einstein equations are differential (and not algebraic), leaving aside the deeper problem about the geometric meaning of these functions. BKL did not calculate the number of independent two-dimensional functions because in this case it is hard to make unambiguous conclusions since the three-dimensional functions are defined by a set of two-dimensional functions (cf. for more details). (Note: The regular decomposition of the general solution of Einstein equations contains (in addition to the four three-dimensional functions) three independent functions of two coordinates (cf. Petrov 1969, Ch. 40; Lifshitz & Khalatnikov (1963, Appendix A)))

Finally, BKL go on to show that the general solution contains the particular solution obtained above for homogeneous models.

Substituting the basis vectors for Bianchi Type IX homogeneous space in eq. 7 the space-time metric of this model takes the form

$ds_{IX}^2 = dt^2 - \left [ \left ( a^2 \sin^2 z + b^2 \cos^2 z \right ) \sin^2 y + c^2 \cos^2 y \right ] dx^2 - \left [ a^2 \cos^2 z + b^2 \sin^2 z \right ] dy^2 - c^2 dz^2 +$ $$\left ( b^2 - a^2 \right ) \sin{2z} \sin{y}\ dx dy - 2c^2 \cos{y}\ dx dz.$$	eq. 121

When c^{2} $\ll$ a^{2}, b^{2}, one can ignore c^{2} everywhere except in the term c^{2} dz^{2}. To move from the synchronous frame used in eq. 121 to a frame with conditions eq. 91, the transformation dt = c dξ/2 and substitution z → z/2 are done. Assuming also that χ ≡ ln (a/b) $\ll$ 1, one obtains from eq. 121 in the first approximation:

$ds_{IX}^2 = \tfrac{1}{4}c^2 \left ( d\xi^2 - dz^2 \right ) - ab \left \{ \sin^2{y} \left ( 1 - \chi \cos{z} \right ) dx^2 + \left ( 1 + \chi \cos{z} \right ) + 2\chi \sin{z} \sin{y}\ dx\ dy \right \}.$	eq. 122

Similarly, with the basis vectors of Bianchi Type VIII homogeneous space, one obtains

$ds_{VIII}^2 = \tfrac{1}{4}c^2 \left ( d\xi^2 - dz^2 \right ) - ab \left \{ \sin^2{y} \left ( \operatorname{ch} z - \chi \right ) dx^2 + \left ( \operatorname{ch} z + \chi \right ) + 2 \operatorname{sh} z \sin{y}\ dx\ dy \right \}.$	eq. 123

According to the analysis of homogeneous spaces above, in both cases ab = ξ (simplifying $a_0^2$ = ξ_{0}) and χ is from eq. 51; function c (ξ) is given by formulae eq. 53 and eq. 61, respectively, for models of Types IX and VIII.

Identical metric for Type VIII is obtained from eq. 112, eq. 115, eq. 116 choosing two-dimensional vectors l_{a} and m_{a} in the form

$l_1 = m_1 = \frac{1}{\sqrt{2}}\sin{y}, \qquad l_2 = m_2 = \frac{1}{\sqrt{2}}$	eq. 124

and substituting

$\rho = \tfrac{1}{2}, \quad A_{20}^* = B_{20} = iAe^{i\xi_0}, \quad A_{1n} = A_{2n} = B_{1n} = B_{2n} = 0 \quad (n \neq 0).$	eq. 125

To obtain the metric for Type IX, one should substitute

$\rho = 0, \omega = 1,$

$A_{11} = -B_{11}^* = A_{1,-1}^* = -B_{1,-1} = -\frac{1}{2} A e^{-i\xi_0},$
$A_{21} = B_{21}^* = A_{2,-1}^* = B_{2,-1} = -\frac{1}{2} i A e^{-i\xi_0},$

$A_{1n} = A_{2n} = B_{1n} = B_{2n} = 0 \quad (n \neq \pm 0)$

eq. 126

(for calculation of c (ξ) the approximation in eq. 116 is not sufficient and the term in ψ linear by ξ is calculated)

This analysis was done for empty space. Including matter does not make the solution less general and does not change its qualitative characteristics.

A limitation of great importance for the general solution is that all 3-dimensional functions contained in the metrics eq. 122 and eq. 123 should have a single and common characteristic change interval. Only this allows to approximate in the Einstein equations all metric spatial component derivatives with simple products of these components by a characteristic wave numbers which results in ordinary differential equations of the type obtained for the Type IX homogeneous model. This is the reason for the coincidence between homogeneous and general solutions.

It follows that both Type IX model and its generalisation contain an oscillatory mode with a single spatial scale of an arbitrary magnitude which is not selected among others by any physical conditions. However, it is known that in non-linear systems with infinite degrees of freedom such mode is unstable and partially dissipates to smaller oscillations. In the general case of small perturbations with an arbitrary spectrum, there will always be some whose amplitudes will increase feeding upon the total process energy. As a result, a complicated picture arises of multi-scale movements with certain energy distribution and energy exchange between oscillations of different scales. It doesn't occur only in the case when the development of small-scale oscillations is impossible because of physical conditions. For the latter, some natural physical length must exist which determines the minimal scale at which energy exits from a system with dynamical degrees of freedom (which, for example, occurs in a liquid with a certain viscosity). However, there is no innate physical scale for a gravitational field in vacuum, and, therefore, there is no impediment for the development of oscillations of arbitrarily small scales.

== Conclusions ==
BKL describe singularities in the cosmologic solution of Einstein equations that have a complicated oscillatory character. Although these singularities have been studied primarily on spatially homogeneous models, there are convincing reasons to assume that singularities in the general solution of Einstein equations have the same characteristics; this circumstance makes the BKL model important for cosmology.

A basis for such statement is the fact that the oscillatory mode in the approach to singularity is caused by the single perturbation that also causes instability in the generalized Kasner solution. A confirmation of the generality of the model is the analytic construction for long era with small oscillations. Although this latter behavior is not a necessary element of metric evolution close to the singularity, it has all principal qualitative properties: metric oscillation in two spatial dimensions and monotonous change in the third dimension with a certain perturbation of this mode at the end of some time interval. However, the transitions between Kasner epochs in the general case of non-homogeneous spatial metric have not been elucidated in details.

The problem connected with the possible limitations upon space geometry caused by the singularity was left aside for further study. It is clear from the outset, however, that the original BKL model is applicable to both finite or infinite space; this is evidenced by the existence of oscillatory singularity models for both closed and open spacetimes.

The oscillatory mode of the approach to singularity gives a new aspect to the term 'finiteness of time'. Between any finite moment of the world time t and the moment t = 0 there is an infinite number of oscillations. In this sense, the process acquires an infinite character. Instead of time t, a more adequate variable for its description is ln t by which the process is extended to $-\infty$.

BKL consider metric evolution in the direction of decreasing time. The Einstein equations are symmetric in respect to the time sign so that a metric evolution in the direction of increasing time is equally possible. However, these two cases are fundamentally different because past and future are not equivalent in the physical sense. Future singularity can be physically meaningful only if it is possible at arbitrary initial conditions existing in a previous moment. Matter distribution and fields in some moment in the evolution of Universe do not necessarily correspond to the specific conditions required for the existence of a given special solution to the Einstein equations.

The choice of solutions corresponding to the real world is related to profound physical requirements which is impossible to find using only the existing relativity theory and which can be found as a result of future synthesis of physical theories. Thus, it may turn out that this choice singles out some special (e.g., isotropic) type of singularity. Nevertheless, it is more natural to assume that because of its general character, the oscillatory mode should be the main characteristic of the initial evolutionary stages.

In this respect, of considerable interest is the property of the "Mixmaster" model shown by Misner, related to propagation of light signals. In the isotropic model, a "light horizon" exists, meaning that for each moment of time, there is some longest distance, at which exchange of light signals and, thus, a causal connection, is impossible: the signal cannot reach such distances for the time since the singularity t = 0.

Signal propagation is determined by the equation ds = 0. In the isotropic model near the singularity t = 0 the interval element is $ds^2 = dt^2 - 2 t d \bar{l}^2$, where $d \bar{l}^2$ is a time-independent spatial differential form. Substituting $t = \eta^2 / 2$ yields

$ds^2 = \eta^2 \left (d\eta^2 - d \bar{l}^2 \right ).$	eq. 127

The "distance" $\Delta \bar l$ reached by the signal is

$\Delta \bar l = \Delta \eta.$	eq. 128

Since η, like t, runs through values starting from 0, up to the "moment" η signals can propagate only at the distance $\Delta \bar{l} \le \eta$ which fixes the farthest distance to the horizon.

The existence of a light horizon in the isotropic model poses a problem in the understanding of the origin of the presently observed isotropy in the relic radiation. According to the isotropic model, the observed isotropy means isotropic properties of radiation that comes to the observer from such regions of space that can not be causally connected with each other. The situation in the oscillatory evolution model near the singularity can be different.

For example, in the homogeneous model for Type IX space, a signal is propagated in a direction in which for a long era, scales change by a law close to ~ t. The square of the distance element in this direction is dl^{2} = t^{2}$\bar{l}^2$, and the respective element of the four-dimensional interval is $ds^2 = dt^2 - t^2 \bar{l}^2$. The substitution $t = e^{\eta}$ puts this in the form

$ds^2 = e^{2 \eta} \left ( d \eta^2 - d \bar{l}^2 \right ),$	eq. 129

and for the signal propagation one has equation of the type eq. 128 again. The important difference is that the variable η runs now through values starting from $-\infty$ (if metric eq. 129 is valid for all t starting from t = 0).

Therefore, for each given "moment" η are found intermediate intervals Δη sufficient for the signal to cover each finite distance.

In this way, during a long era a light horizon is opened in a given space direction. Although the duration of each long era is still finite, during the course of the world evolution eras change an infinite number of times in different space directions. This circumstance makes one expect that in this model a causal connection between events in the whole space is possible. Because of this property, Misner named this model "Mixmaster universe" by a brand name of a dough-blending machine.

As time passes and one goes away from the singularity, the effect of matter on metric evolution, which was insignificant at the early stages of evolution, gradually increases and eventually becomes dominant. It can be expected that this effect will lead to a gradual "isotropisation" of space as a result of which its characteristics come closer to the Friedman model which adequately describes the present state of the Universe.

Finally, BKL pose the problem about the feasibility of considering a "singular state" of a world with infinitely dense matter on the basis of the existing relativity theory. The physical application of the Einstein equations in their present form in these conditions can be made clear only in the process of a future synthesis of physical theories and in this sense the problem can not be solved at present.

It is important that the gravitational theory itself does not lose its logical cohesion (i.e., does not lead to internal controversies) at whatever matter densities. In other words, this theory is not limited by the conditions that it imposes, which could make logically inadmissible and controversial its application at very large densities; limitations could, in principle, appear only as a result of factors that are "external" to the gravitational theory. This circumstance makes the study of singularities in cosmological models formally acceptable and necessary in the frame of existing theory.

== Bibliography ==
- Andersson, Lars; Rendall, Alan D. (2001). "Quiescent cosmological singularities". Communications in Mathematical Physics. 218 (3): 479–511. arXiv:gr-qc/0001047. Bibcode:2001CMaPh.218..479A. doi:10.1007/s002200100406. S2CID 16167683.
- Ashtekar, Abhay; Henderson, Adam; Sloan, David (2011). "Hamiltonian formulation of the Belinskii-Khalatnikov-Lifshitz conjecture". Physical Review D. 83 (8) 084024. arXiv:1102.3474. Bibcode:2011PhRvD..83h4024A. doi:10.1103/PhysRevD.83.084024. S2CID 119888235.
- Barrow, John D.; Tipler, Frank J. (1979). "Analysis of the generic singularity studies by Belinskii, Khalatnikov, and Lifshitz". Physics Reports. 56 (7): 371–402. Bibcode:1979PhR....56..371B. doi:10.1016/0370-1573(79)90097-8.
- Barrow, John D.; Tipler, Frank J. (1981). "Generic singularity studies revisited". Physics Letters. 82A (9): 441–445. doi:10.1016/B978-0-08-036364-6.50050-8.
- Belinsky, Vladimir A.; Khalatnikov, I.M. (1966). "A general solution of the gravitational equations with a simultaneous fictitious singularity". JETP. 49 (3): 1000. Bibcode:1966JETP...22..694B.
- Belinsky, Vladimir A.; Khalatnikov, I.M. (1969a). "On the nature of the singularities in the general solution of the gravitational equations". JETP. 56: 1700.
- Belinsky, Vladimir A.; Khalatnikov, I.M. (1969b). "General solution of the gravitational equations with a physical singularity". JETP. 57: 2163.
- Belinsky, Vladimir A.; Khalatnikov, Isaak M.; Lifshitz, Evgeny M. (1970). "Колебательный режим приближения к особой точке в релятивистской космологии". Uspekhi Fizicheskikh Nauk. 102 (11): 463–500. Bibcode:1970UsFiN.102..463B. doi:10.3367/ufnr.0102.197011d.0463.; English translation in Belinskii, V.A.; Khalatnikov, I.M.; Lifshitz, E.M. (1970). "Oscillatory Approach to a Singular Point in the Relativistic Cosmology". Advances in Physics. 19 (80): 525–573. Bibcode:1970AdPhy..19..525B. doi:10.1080/00018737000101171.
- Belinsky, Vladimir A.; Khalatnikov, Isaak M. (1970). "General solution of the gravitational equations with a physical oscillatory singularity". JETP. 59: 314. Bibcode:1971JETP...32..169B.
- Belinsky, Vladimir A.; Khalatnikov, I.M.; Lifshitz, E.M. (1971). "The oscillatory mode of approach to a singularity in homogeneous cosmological models with rotating axes". JETP. 60 (6): 1969–1979.
- Belinsky, V.A. (1992). "Turbulence of a Gravitational Field near a Cosmological Singularity". JETP Letters. 56 (9): 437–440.
- Belinski, Vladimir; Henneaux, Marc (2018). The Cosmological Singularity. Cambridge University Press. arXiv:1404.3864. Bibcode:2018cosm.book.....B. doi:10.1017/9781107239333. ISBN 978-1-107-04747-1.
- Berger, Beverly; Moncrief, Vincent (1993). "Numerical investigation of cosmological singularities". Physical Review D. 48 (10): 4676–4687. arXiv:gr-qc/9307032. Bibcode:1993PhRvD..48.4676B. doi:10.1103/PhysRevD.48.4676. PMID 10016121. S2CID 450414.
- Berger, Beverly K.; Moncrief, Vincent (1998). "Numerical evidence that the singularity in polarized U(1) symmetric cosmologies on T^{3} × R is velocity dominated". Physical Review D. 57 (12): 7235–7240. arXiv:gr-qc/9801078. Bibcode:1998PhRvD..57.7235B. doi:10.1103/PhysRevD.57.7235. S2CID 119539705.
- Berger, Beverly; Garfinkle, David; Isenberg, James; Moncrief, Vincent; Weaver, Marsha (1998). "The singularity in generic gravitational collapse is spacelike, local, and oscillatory". Modern Physics Letters A. 13 (19): 1565–1573. arXiv:gr-qc/9805063. Bibcode:1998MPLA...13.1565B. doi:10.1142/S0217732398001649. S2CID 118889710.
- Berger, Beverly K.; Moncrief, Vincent (2000). "Signature for local Mixmaster dynamics in U(1) symmetric cosmologies". Physical Review D. 62 (12) 123501. arXiv:gr-qc/0006071. Bibcode:2000PhRvD..62l3501B. doi:10.1103/PhysRevD.62.123501. S2CID 10389665.
- Berger, Beverly K (2002). "Numerical Approaches to Spacetime Singularities". Living Reviews in Relativity. 5 (1) 1. arXiv:gr-qc/0201056. Bibcode:2002LRR.....5....1B. doi:10.12942/lrr-2002-1. PMC 5256073. PMID 28179859.
- Bini, Donato; Cherubini, Christian; Jantzen, Robert (2007). "The Lifshitz-Khalatnikov Kasner index parametrization and the Weyl tensor". Il Nuovo Cimento B. 122 (5): 521–536. arXiv:0710.4902. Bibcode:2007NCimB.122..521B. doi:10.1393/ncb/i2007-10396-4. S2CID 15854390.
- Bini, Donato; Cherubini, Christian; Geralico, Andrea; Jantzen, Robert T. (2009). "Electrocardiogram of the Mixmaster Universe". Classical and Quantum Gravity. 26 (2) 025012. arXiv:0808.0828. Bibcode:2009CQGra..26b5012B. doi:10.1088/0264-9381/26/2/025012. S2CID 14552653.
- Bondi, Herman; Pirani, F.A.E.; Robinson, I. (1959). "Gravitational Waves in General Relativity. III. Exact Plane Waves". Proceedings of the Royal Society of London. Series A, Mathematical and Physical Sciences. 251 (1267): 519–533. Bibcode:1959RSPSA.251..519B. doi:10.1098/rspa.1959.0124. JSTOR 100727. S2CID 122766998.
- Chernoff, David F.; Barrow, J.D. (1983). "Chaos in the Mixmaster Universe". Physical Review Letters. 50 (2): 134–137. Bibcode:1983PhRvL..50..134C. doi:10.1103/PhysRevLett.50.134.
- Damour, Thibault; Henneaux, Marc (2000). "Chaos in superstring cosmology". Physical Review Letters. 85 (5): 920–923. arXiv:hep-th/0003139. Bibcode:2000PhRvL..85..920D. doi:10.1103/PhysRevLett.85.920. PMID 10991439. S2CID 10752273.
- Damour, Thibault; Henneaux, Marc; Julia, Bernard; Nicolai, Hermann (2001). "Hyperbolic Kac–Moody algebras and chaos in Kaluza-Klein models". Physics Letters B. 509 (3–4): 323–330. arXiv:hep-th/0103094. Bibcode:2001PhLB..509..323D. doi:10.1016/S0370-2693(01)00498-1. S2CID 16964946.
- Damour, Thibault; Henneaux, Marc; Nicolai, Hermann (2003). "Cosmological billiards". Classical and Quantum Gravity. 20 (9): R145–R200. arXiv:hep-th/0212256. doi:10.1088/0264-9381/20/9/201. S2CID 250877925.
- Damour, Thibault; Henneaux, Marc; Rendall, Alan D.; Weaver, Marsha (2002). "Kasner-like behaviour for subcritical Einstein-matter systems". Annales Henri Poincaré. 3 (6): 1049–1111. arXiv:gr-qc/0202069. Bibcode:2002AnHP....3.1049D. doi:10.1007/s000230200000. S2CID 17092394.
- Demaret, Jacques; Henneaux, Marc; Spindel, Philipe (1985). "Non-oscillatory behaviour in vacuum Kaluza–Klein cosmologies". Physics Letters. 164B (1–3): 27–29. Bibcode:1985PhLB..164...27D. doi:10.1016/0370-2693(85)90024-3.
- Demaret, Jacques; Hanquin, Jean-Luc; Henneaux, Marc; Spindel, Philipe; Taormina, Anna (1986). "The fate of the Mixmaster behaviour in vacuum inhomogeneous Kaluza-Klein cosmological models". Physics Letters B. 175 (2): 129–132. Bibcode:1986PhLB..175..129D. doi:10.1016/0370-2693(86)90701-X.
- Demaret, Jacques; de Rop, Yves; Henneaux, Marc (1989). "Are Kaluza-Klein models of the Universe chaotic?". International Journal of Theoretical Physics. 28 (9): 1067–1079. Bibcode:1989IJTP...28.1067D. doi:10.1007/BF00670349. S2CID 121065247.
- Einstein, Albert; Rosen, Nathan (1937). "On gravitational waves". Journal of the Franklin Institute. 223 (1): 43–54. Bibcode:1937FrInJ.223...43E. doi:10.1016/S0016-0032(37)90583-0.
- Frasca, Marco (2006). "Strong coupling expansion for general relativity". International Journal of Modern Physics D. 15 (9): 1373–1386. arXiv:hep-th/0508246. Bibcode:2006IJMPD..15.1373F. doi:10.1142/S0218271806009091. S2CID 15369171.
- Garfinkle, David (2004). "Numerical Simulations of Generic Singularities". Phys. Rev. Lett. 93 (16) 161101. arXiv:gr-qc/0312117. Bibcode:2004PhRvL..93p1101G. doi:10.1103/PhysRevLett.93.161101. PMID 15524970. S2CID 37917240.
- Garfinkle, David (2007). "Numerical simulations of general gravitational singularities". Classical and Quantum Gravity. 24 (12): 295–306. arXiv:0808.0160. Bibcode:2007CQGra..24S.295G. doi:10.1088/0264-9381/24/12/S19. S2CID 16899122.
- Geroch, Robert P. (1966). "Singularities in Closed Universes". Physical Review Letters. 17 (8): 445–447. Bibcode:1966PhRvL..17..445G. doi:10.1103/PhysRevLett.17.445.
- Góźdź, Andrzej; Pędrak, Aleksandra; Piechocki, Włodzimierz (2023). "Quantum dynamics corresponding to the chaotic BKL scenario". The European Physical Journal C. 83 (2): 150. arXiv:2204.11274. Bibcode:2023EPJC...83..150G. doi:10.1140/epjc/s10052-023-11284-6. S2CID 254044770.
- Hawking, Stephen W. (1965). "Occurrence of Singularities in Open Universes". Physical Review Letters. 15 (17): 689–690. Bibcode:1965PhRvL..15..689H. doi:10.1103/PhysRevLett.15.689.
- Hawking, Stephen W.; Ellis, G.F.R. (1968). "The Cosmic Black-Body Radiation and the Existence of Singularities in Our Universe". Astrophysical Journal. 152: 25. Bibcode:1968ApJ...152...25H. doi:10.1086/149520.
- Heinzle, J. Mark; Uggla, Claes; Röhr, Niklas (2009). "The cosmological billiard attractor". Adv. Theor. Math. Phys. 13 (2): 293–407. arXiv:gr-qc/0702141. Bibcode:2007gr.qc.....2141H. doi:10.4310/ATMP.2009.v13.n2.a1. S2CID 119470976.
- Henneaux, Marc; Persson, Daniel; Spindel, Philippe (2008). "Spacelike Singularities and Hidden Symmetries of Gravity". Living Reviews in Relativity. 11 (1): 1. arXiv:0710.1818. Bibcode:2008LRR....11....1H. doi:10.12942/lrr-2008-1. PMC 5255974. PMID 28179821.
- Kac, Victor G. (1983). Infinite dimensional Lie algebras: an introduction. Progress in Mathematics. Vol. 44. Basel: Birkhäuser. p. 245. doi:10.1007/978-1-4757-1382-4. ISBN 978-0-8176-3118-5.
- Kasner, Edward (1921). "Geometrical Theorems on Einstein's Cosmological Equations". American Journal of Mathematics. 43 (4): 217–221. Bibcode:1921AmJM...43..217K. doi:10.2307/2370192. JSTOR 2370192.
- Khalatnikov, Isaak M.; Lifshitz, E.M.; Khanin, K.M.; Shchur, L.N.; Sinai, Ya.G. (1985). "On the stochasticity in relativistic cosmology". Journal of Statistical Physics. 38 (1–2): 97–114. Bibcode:1985JSP....38...97K. doi:10.1007/BF01017851. S2CID 120521834.
- Khalatnikov, Isaak M.; Kamenshchik, Aleksander Yu. (2008). "Lev Landau and the problem of singularities in cosmology". Physics-Uspekhi. 51 (6): 609–616. arXiv:0803.2684. Bibcode:2008PhyU...51..609K. doi:10.1070/PU2008v051n06ABEH006550. S2CID 14878079.
- Khalatnikov, I.M.; Lifshitz, E.M. (1970). "General Cosmological Solution of the Gravitational Equations with a Singularity in Time". Physical Review Letters. 24 (2): 76. Bibcode:1970PhRvL..24...76K. doi:10.1103/PhysRevLett.24.76.
- Landau, Lev D.; Lifshitz, Evgeny M. (1988). Classical Theory of Fields. Course of Theoretical Physics. Vol. 2 (7th ed.). Moscow: Nauka. ISBN 978-5-02-014420-0.
- Landau, Lev D.; Lifshitz, Evgeny M. (1987). Fluid Mechanics. Course of Theoretical Physics. Vol. 6 (2nd ed.). Butterworth-Heinemann. ISBN 978-0-08-033933-7.
- Lifshitz, Evgeny M.; I.M. Khalatnikov (1961). "On the singularities of cosmological solutions of the gravitational equations.I". JETP. 39: 149.
- Lifshitz, Evgeny M.; I.M. Khalatnikov (1961). "On the singularities of cosmological solutions of the gravitational equations.II". JETP. 39: 800.
- Lifshitz, Evgeny M.; Sudakov, V.V.; Khalatnikov, I.M. (1961). "Singularities of cosmological solutions of the gravitational equations.III". JETP. 40: 1847.; Physical Review Letters, 6, 311 (1961)
- Lifshitz, Evgeny M.; Khalatnikov, Isaak M. (1963). "Проблемы релятивистской космологии". Uspekhi Fizicheskikh Nauk. 80 (7): 391–438. doi:10.3367/UFNr.0080.196307d.0391.; English translation in Lifshitz, E.M.; Khalatnikov, I.M. (1963). "Problems in the Relativistic Cosmology". Advances in Physics. 12 (46): 185. Bibcode:1963AdPhy..12..185L. doi:10.1080/00018736300101283.
- Lifshitz, Evgeny M.; Khalatnikov, Isaak M. (1970). "Oscillatory mode of approach to a singularity in the open cosmological model". JETP Letters. 11: 200–203.
- Lifshitz, E.M.; Lifshitz, I.M.; Khalatnikov, I.M. (1970). "Asymptotic analysis of oscillatory mode of approach to a singularity in homogeneous cosmological models". JETP. 59: 322. Bibcode:1970ZhETF..59..322L.
- Misner, Ch. W. (1969). "Mixmaster Universe". Physical Review Letters. 22 (20): 1071–1074. Bibcode:1969PhRvL..22.1071M. doi:10.1103/PhysRevLett.22.1071.
- Misner, Charles W.; Thorne, Kip S.; Wheeler, John Archibald (1973). Gravitation. San Francisco: W.H. Freeman. ISBN 978-0-7167-0334-1.
- Nelson, Robert A. (1981). "Coordinate-dependent 3 + 1 formulation of the General Relativity equations for a perfect fluid". General Relativity and Gravitation. 13 (6): 569–580. Bibcode:1981GReGr..13..569N. doi:10.1007/BF00757243. S2CID 122196359.
- Penrose, Roger (1965). "Gravitational Collapse and Space-Time Singularities". Physical Review Letters. 14 (3): 57–59. Bibcode:1965PhRvL..14...57P. doi:10.1103/PhysRevLett.14.57.
- Petrov, Alexey Z. (1969). Einstein Spaces. Oxford: Pergamon Press. ISBN 978-0-08-012315-8.
- Rugh, Svend E. (1994). "Chaos in the Einstein Equations -- characterization and importance?". Deterministic Chaos in General Relativity. Kananaskis, Alberta, Canada: Springer Science+Business Media New York. pp. 359–422. doi:10.1007/978-1-4757-9993-4. ISBN 978-1-4757-9995-8.
- Saotome, Ryo; Akhoury, Ratindranath; Garfinkle, David (2010). "Examining gravitational collapse with test scalar fields". Classical and Quantum Gravity. 27 (16) 165019. arXiv:1004.3569. Bibcode:2010CQGra..27p5019S. doi:10.1088/0264-9381/27/16/165019. S2CID 55229333.
- Taub, A.H. (1951). "Empty space-times admitting a three parameter group of motions". Annals of Mathematics. Second Series. 53 (3): 472–490. Bibcode:1951AnMat..53..472T. doi:10.2307/1969567. ISSN 0003-486X. JSTOR 1969567. MR 0041565.
- Thorne, Kip (1994). Black Holes and Time Warps: Einstein's Outrageous Legacy. W W Norton. ISBN 978-0-393-31276-8.]; Kip Thorne (2015). Geometrodynamics: The Nonlinear Dynamics of Curved Spacetime (Video lecture). The Van Leer Jerusalem Institute.
- Uggla, Claes; van Elst, Henk; Wainwright, John; Ellis, George F.R. (2003). "Past attractor in inhomogeneous cosmology". Physical Review D. 68 (10) 103502. arXiv:gr-qc/0304002. Bibcode:2003PhRvD..68j3502U. doi:10.1103/PhysRevD.68.103502. S2CID 53635765.
- Weaver, Marsha; Isenberg, James; Berger, Beverly K. (1998). "Mixmaster behavior in inhomogeneous cosmological spacetimes". Physical Review Letters. 80 (14): 2984–2987. arXiv:gr-qc/9712055. Bibcode:1998PhRvL..80.2984W. doi:10.1103/PhysRevLett.80.2984. S2CID 119467400.
- Damour, Thibault (19 November 2015). The Structure of Cosmological Singularities (Video lecture). Institut Henri Poincaré.
