= Kasner metric =

Solution of Einstein field equations

Figure 1. Dynamics of Kasner metrics eq. 2 in spherical coordinates towards singularity. The Lifshitz-Khalatnikov parameter is u=2 (1/u=0.5) and the r coordinate is 2p_{α}(1/u)τ where τ is logarithmic time: τ = ln t. Shrinking along the axes is linear and uniform (no chaoticity).

The Kasner metric (developed by and named for the American mathematician Edward Kasner in 1921) is an exact solution to Albert Einstein's theory of general relativity. It describes an anisotropic universe without matter (i.e., it is a vacuum solution). It can be written in any spacetime dimension $D>3$ and has strong connections with the study of gravitational chaos.

== Metric and conditions ==
The metric in $D>3$ spacetime dimensions is

$$\text{d}s^2 = -\text{d}t^2 + \sum_{j=1}^{D-1} t^{2p_j} [\text{d}x^j]^2$$,

and contains $D-1$ constants $p_j$, called the Kasner exponents. The metric describes a spacetime whose equal-time slices are spatially flat, however space is expanding or contracting at different rates in different directions, depending on the values of the $p_j$. Test particles in this metric whose comoving coordinate differs by $\Delta x^j$ are separated by a physical distance $t^{p_j}\Delta x^j$.

The Kasner metric is an exact solution to Einstein's equations in vacuum when the Kasner exponents satisfy the following Kasner conditions,

$$\sum_{j=1}^{D-1} p_j = 1,$$

$$\sum_{j=1}^{D-1} p_j^2 = 1.$$

The first condition defines a plane, the Kasner plane, and the second describes a sphere, the Kasner sphere. The solutions (choices of $p_j$) satisfying the two conditions therefore lie on the sphere where the two intersect (sometimes confusingly also called the Kasner sphere). In $D$ spacetime dimensions, the space of solutions therefore lie on a $D-3$ dimensional sphere $S^{D-3}$.

== Features ==
There are several noticeable and unusual features of the Kasner solution:

- The volume of the spatial slices is always $O(t)$. This is because their volume is proportional to $\sqrt{-g}$, and

$$\sqrt{-g} = t^{p_1 + p_2 + \cdots + p_{D-1}} = t$$

where we have used the first Kasner condition. Therefore $t\to 0$ can describe either a Big Bang or a Big Crunch, depending on the sense of $t$

- Isotropic expansion or contraction of space is not allowed. If the spatial slices were expanding isotropically, then all of the Kasner exponents must be equal, and therefore $p_j = 1/(D-1)$ to satisfy the first Kasner condition. But then the second Kasner condition cannot be satisfied, for

$$\sum_{j=1}^{D-1} p_j^2 = \frac{1}{D-1} \ne 1.$$

The Friedmann–Lemaître–Robertson–Walker metric employed in cosmology, by contrast, is able to expand or contract isotropically because of the presence of matter.

- With a little more work, one can show that at least one Kasner exponent is always negative (unless we are at one of the solutions with a single $p_j=1$, and the rest vanishing). Suppose we take the time coordinate $t$ to increase from zero. Then this implies that while the volume of space is increasing like $t$, at least one direction (corresponding to the negative Kasner exponent) is actually contracting.
- The Kasner metric is a solution to the vacuum Einstein equations, and so the Ricci tensor always vanishes for any choice of exponents satisfying the Kasner conditions. The full Riemann tensor vanishes only when a single $p_j=1$ and the rest vanish, in which case the space is flat. The Minkowski metric can be recovered via the coordinate transformation $t' = t \cosh x_j$ and $x_j' = t \sinh x_j$.

== See also ==
- BKL singularity
- Mixmaster universe
