= Beverly Berger =

American physicist

Beverly K. Berger is an American physicist known for her work on gravitational physics, especially gravitational waves, gravitons, and gravitational singularities. Alongside Berger's more serious physics research, she is also known for noticing that vibrational patterns caused by local ravens were interfering with observations at the Laser Interferometer Gravitational-Wave Observatory.

== Education and career ==
Berger completed her Ph.D. at the University of Maryland, College Park in 1972. Her dissertation, A Cosmological Model Illustrating Particle Creation through Graviton Production, was supervised by Charles W. Misner.

Long a professor of physics at Oakland University, she also worked for over ten years as a program officer for general relativity and gravitation at the National Science Foundation before retiring in 2012. She is a visiting scholar in the LIGO collaboration at Stanford University.

== Service ==
Within the American Physical Society (APS), Berger was instrumental in founding the Topical Group on Gravitation, later to become the Division of Gravitational Physics. She was its first chair, in 1996, and served as chair again in 2014–2015. She also chaired the APS Committee on the Status of Women in Physics in 2000.

Berger has been secretary of the International Society on General Relativity and Gravitation since 2010, and has represented the US at the International Union of Pure and Applied Physics.

== Books ==
With Abhay Ashtekar, James A. Isenberg, and Malcolm MacCallum, Berger is co-editor of the book General Relativity and Gravitation: A Centennial Perspective (Cambridge University Press, 2015).

The American Astronomical Society and IOP Publishing have announced the book Vignettes from General Relativity by Berger as expected to be published in 2021.

== Recognition ==
In 1983, the National Science Foundation awarded Berger a Visiting Professorship for Women in Science and Engineering. In 1998, she was named a Fellow of the American Physical Society, after a nomination by the APS Division of Gravitational Physics, "for her pioneering contributions to global issues in classical general relativity, particularly the analysis of the nature of cosmological singularities, and for founding the Topical Group on Gravitation of the APS". On the occasion of her retirement in 2012, she was honored by a special session of the April 2012 APS meeting.
