= Marc Henneaux =

Belgian theoretical physicist and professor

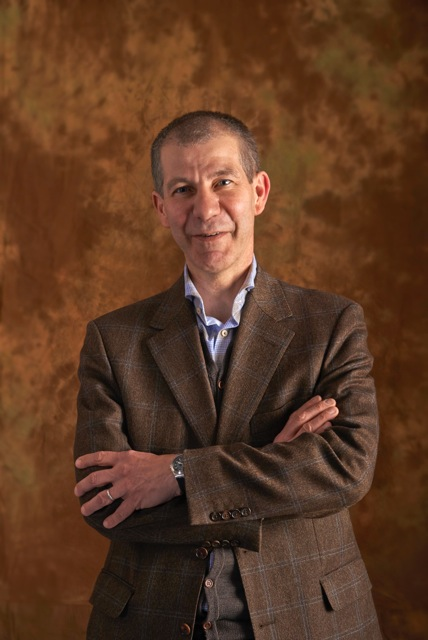
Marc Henneaux

Marc, Baron Henneaux is a Belgian theoretical physicist and professor at the Universite libre de Bruxelles (ULB) who was born in Brussels on 5 March 1955.

== Education and career ==
Henneaux studied physics at ULB and received his doctoral degree in 1980 under the supervision of Jules Géhéniau. He was a visiting fellow at Princeton University for the academic year 1978-1979 where a long-term collaboration with Claudio Bunster was initiated. He was then postdoctoral research associate and lecturer at the University of Texas at Austin from 1981 to 1984, to continue working with Claudio Bunster. From there, he held a research position at the Belgian Science foundation (FNRS) until 1992, after which he was appointed associate professor at the University of Brussels (1993–1996).

He is currently Full Professor at the University of Brussels since October 1996. He also serves as Director of the International Solvay Institutes for Physics and Chemistry, founded by Ernest Solvay since January 2004. In 2017, Henneaux was appointed Professor at the Collège de France where he holds the Chair "Champs, Cordes et Gravité".

=== Research ===
The research of Henneaux is devoted to the study of the theoretical models describing the fundamental physical interactions (electromagnetism, weak and strong nuclear forces, gravity), with a particular emphasis on their symmetries. With J. David Brown, he showed that Einstein's theory of gravity in three spacetime dimensions with a negative cosmological constant possesses a remarkable symmetry structure at infinity described by two Virasoro algebras. The corresponding central charge bears the name of "Brown–Henneaux central charge". This work is sometimes regarded as one of the precursors of the celebrated AdS/CFT correspondence. Henneaux also studied the geometrical and algebraic aspects of theories with a gauge freedom, and in particular on the so-called Becchi–Rouet–Stora–Tyutin symmetry and its cohomology. More recently, in collaboration with Thibault Damour, he showed that hyperbolic Coxeter groups appear somewhat unexpectedly in gravitational theories and their supersymmetric extensions, in the BKL behaviour of the fields near a spacelike singularity.

== Main prizes and awards ==
- Louis Empain Prize (Belgium) – 1989.
- Francqui Prize – 2000 (Belgium) – "for his exceptional contributions to our understanding of the forces of Nature", in particular for having "anticipated by more than ten years … a crucial step for understanding the challenge raised by the incorporation of Einstein general relativity in quantum mechanics." (citation of the Jury)
- Humboldt Research Award (Germany – 2009).
- ERC Advanced Grant (2011–2015)
- 2014 Bogoliubov Prize of the "Joint Institute for Nuclear Research" (Dubna, Russia), with Valery Rubakov, "for outstanding achievements in theoretical and mathematical physics, promoting international cooperation, and educating young scientists"
- FNRS Quinquennal Prize "Dr A. De Leeuw-Damry-Bourlart" (Fundamental Exact Sciences) (Belgium) for the period 2011–2015
- ERC Advanced Grant (2016–2021).

== Other distinctions ==
- Member of the Royal Academy of Belgium – Since May 2002.
- Francqui Chair – Vrije Universiteit Brussel – Academic Year 2002–2003.
- Andrejewski Chair – Universities of Leipzig and Jena – May 2003.
- Honorary Degree (Doctor Honoris Causa) – University of Craiova (Romania) – 2010
- Created "Baron" in 2015 by Philippe, King of the Belgians.

== Bibliography ==
- C. Teitelboim, M. Henneaux, Quantization of gauge systems, Princeton University Press, 1992.
