= Mixmaster universe =

Model of the early universe

The Mixmaster universe (named after Sunbeam Mixmaster, a brand of Sunbeam Products electric kitchen mixer) is a solution to Einstein field equations of general relativity studied by Charles Misner in 1969 in an effort to better understand the dynamics of the early universe. He hoped to solve the horizon problem in a natural way by showing that the early universe underwent an oscillatory, chaotic epoch.

== Discussion ==
The model is similar to the closed Friedmann–Lemaître–Robertson–Walker universe, in that spatial slices are positively curved and are topologically three-spheres $S^3$. However, in the FRW universe, the $S^3$ can only expand or contract: the only dynamical parameter is overall size of the $S^3$, parameterized by the scale factor $a(t)$. In the Mixmaster universe, the $S^3$ can expand or contract, but also distort anisotropically. Its evolution is described by a scale factor $a(t)$ as well as by two shape parameters $\beta_\pm(t)$. Values of the shape parameters describe distortions of the $S^3$ that preserve its volume and also maintain a constant Ricci curvature scalar. Therefore, as the three parameters $a,\beta_\pm$ assume different values, homogeneity but not isotropy is preserved.

The model has a rich dynamical structure. Misner showed that the shape parameters $\beta_\pm(t)$ act like the coordinates of a point mass moving in a triangular potential with steeply rising walls with friction. By studying the motion of this point, Misner showed that the physical universe would expand in some directions and contract in others, with the directions of expansion and contraction changing repeatedly. Because the potential is roughly triangular, Misner suggested that the evolution is chaotic.

== Metric ==
The metric studied by Misner (very slightly modified from his notation) is given by,

$$\text{d}s^2 = -\text{d}t^2 + \sum_{k=1}^3 {L_k^2(t)} \sigma_k \otimes \sigma_k$$

where

$$L_k = R(t)e^{\beta_k}$$

and the $\sigma_k$, considered as differential forms, are defined by

$$\sigma_1 = \sin \psi \text{d}\theta - \cos\psi \sin\theta\text{d}\phi$$

$$\sigma_2 = \cos \psi \text{d}\theta + \sin\psi \sin\theta\text{d}\phi$$

$$\sigma_3 = -\text{d}\psi - \cos\theta\text{d}\phi$$

In terms of the coordinates $(\theta,\psi,\phi)$. These satisfy

$$\text{d}\sigma_i = \frac{1}{2}\epsilon_{ijk} \sigma_j \wedge \sigma_k$$

where $\text{d}$ is the exterior derivative and $\wedge$ the wedge product of differential forms. The 1-forms $\sigma_i$ form a left-invariant co-frame on the Lie group SU(2), which is diffeomorphic to the 3-sphere $S^3$, so the spatial metric in Misner's model can concisely be described as just a left-invariant metric on the 3-sphere; indeed, up to the adjoint action of SU(2), this is actually the general left-invariant metric. As the metric evolves via Einstein's equation, the geometry of this $S^3$ typically distorts anisotropically. Misner defines parameters $\Omega(t)$ and $R(t)$ which measure the volume of spatial slices, as well as "shape parameters" $\beta_k$, by

$$R(t) = e^{-\Omega(t)} = (L_1(t) L_2(t) L_3(t))^{1/3}, \quad \sum_{k=1}^3 \beta_k(t) = 0$$.

Since there is one condition on the three $\beta_k$, there should only be two free functions, which Misner chooses to be $\beta_\pm$, defined as

$$\beta_+ = \beta_1 + \beta_2 = -\beta_3, \quad \beta_- = \frac{\beta_1 - \beta_2}{\sqrt{3}}$$

The evolution of the universe is then described by finding $\beta_\pm$ as functions of $\Omega$.

== Applications to cosmology ==
Misner hoped that the chaos would churn up and smooth out the early universe. Also, during periods in which one direction was static (e.g., going from expansion to contraction) formally the Hubble horizon $H^{-1}$ in that direction is infinite, which he suggested meant that the horizon problem could be solved. Since the directions of expansion and contraction varied, presumably given enough time the horizon problem would get solved in every direction.

While an interesting example of gravitational chaos, it is widely recognized that the cosmological problems the Mixmaster universe attempts to solve are more elegantly tackled by cosmic inflation. The metric Misner studied is also known as the Bianchi type IX metric.

== Applications to black holes ==
Before the 1970s, most physicists believed that the interior of a Schwarzschild black hole curved inwards towards a sharp point at the singularity. However, in the late 1960s, Soviet physicists Vladimir Belinskii, Isaak Khalatnikov, and Evgeny Lifshitz discovered that this model was only true when the spacetime inside the black hole had not been perturbed. Any perturbations, such as those caused by matter or radiation falling in, would cause space to oscillate chaotically near the singularity according to Mixmaster dynamics. Any matter falling in would experience intense tidal forces rapidly changing in direction, all while being compressed into an increasingly small volume.

== See also ==
- Bianchi classification
- BKL singularity
