= James A. Isenberg =

American mathematician and physicist (b. 1951)

James A. Isenberg Professor Emeritus
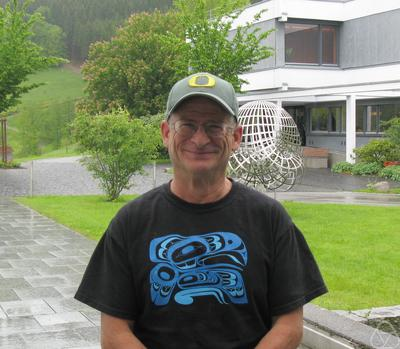
- Occupations: Mathematician; Physicist
- Title: Professor of Mathematics
- Awards: American Physical Society Fellow; American Mathematical Society Fellow

Academic background
- Education: 1973 A.B. in physics, Princeton University; 1979 Ph.D. in physics, University of Maryland
- Thesis: Construction of Spacetimes from Initial Data (1979)
- Doctoral advisor: Charles Misner

James A. Isenberg (born 1951) is an American theoretical physicist and mathematician, professor emeritus at the University of Oregon.

== Personal life and education ==
Isenberg was born in 1951 in Boston. He became an Eagle Scout in 1966, and in 1969 graduated as valedictorian from Plymouth-Whitemarsh High School in Plymouth Meeting, Pennsylvania, where he was also selected as one of the top 40 finalists in the Westinghouse Science Talent Search.

When he ran the Boston Marathon at age 18, The Philadelphia Inquirer reported he "is 5 feet 1 inch tall, weighs 95 pounds and looks about 13." He wore his birth certificate pinned to his jersey to prove his age. He also ran in the inaugural 1970 New York City Marathon. Isenberg says he has "completed 143 marathons, including 30 Boston Marathons."

At Princeton University he graduated summa cum laude with an A.B. in physics in 1973. While at Princeton, he earned varsity letters in cross-country, wrestling, and track, and was awarded the Class of 1916 Cup upon graduating. He was a graduate student under Charles Misner at the University of Maryland, and he earned a Ph.D. in physics in 1979, with his dissertation, Construction of Spacetimes from Initial Data.

In December 2017 at Bondi Beach in Sydney, Australia, Isenberg was standing in the ocean when a wave knocked him over, injuring his spinal cord and leaving him paralyzed from the neck down. He received care at Thomas Jefferson University Hospital before transferring to Magee Rehabilitation Hospital in Philadelphia. In 2019 at the Princeton alumni parade, he "led his class down the route in a wheelchair".

Isenberg lives in McLean, Virginia, with his wife, economist Pauline Kennedy.

== Career ==
Isenberg is one of the pioneers in the study of the constraint equations in classical general relativity. His many important contributions include the completion of the solution theory of the constraint equations on closed manifolds with constant mean curvature, and with his collaborators, the first nontrivial results on the non-constant mean curvature case.

From 1973 to 1979, Isenberg held positions in the physics department at the University of Maryland. Between 1979 and 1982 he held a postdoctoral fellow positions in the applied mathematics department of the University of Waterloo and the mathematics department at the University of California, Berkeley.

Isenberg joined the mathematics department faculty at the University of Oregon in 1982 and in 2021 became a professor emeritus of mathematics at the University of Oregon.

== Recognition ==
Isenberg was elected a Fellow of the American Physical Society in 2000, cited "For his pioneering work on global issues in general relativity and for his contributions to the field."

The American Physical Society recognized Isenberg as a 2023 recipient of the 5 Sigma Physicist Honor for his science policy advocacy work.

He was named to the 2021 class of fellows of the American Mathematical Society "for contributions to mathematical general relativity and geometry flows".

The Pacific Coast Gravity Meeting was initiated by Isenberg in 1985, along with Kip Thorne, Gary Horowitz, and James Hartle. The conference has been dedicated to Isenberg as of the 34th meeting at Caltech in 2018 and is now known as the Jim Isenberg Pacific Coast Gravity Meeting.

== Selected works ==
- Chow, Bennett; et al. (2007–2015). The Ricci Flow: Techniques and Applications. Mathematical Surveys and Monographs. Vol. 135, 144, 163, 206. American Mathematical Society.
- Isenberg, J. (1995). "Constant mean curvature solution of the Einstein constraint equations on closed manifold". Class. Quantum Grav. 12 (9): 2249–2274. Bibcode:1995CQGra..12.2249I. doi:10.1088/0264-9381/12/9/013.
