= Index of physics articles (M) =

The index of physics articles is split into multiple pages due to its size.

To navigate by individual letter use the table of contents below.

== M ==
- M-theory
- M-theory simplified
- M. J. Whelan
- M. C. Joshi
- M. G. K. Menon
- M. J. Seaton
- M. Jamal Deen
- M. King Hubbert
- M. P. Parameswaran
- M. Shamsher Ali
- M. Vijayan
- M. Yousuff Hussaini
- M82 X-1
- MAJORANA
- MARIACHI
- MAUD Committee
- MAX-lab
- MAX IV
- MCP-RHEED
- MELCOR
- MEMO Model
- MERLIN
- MERLIN reactor
- MHD generator
- MINDO
- MINERνA
- MINOS
- MIRACL
- MIT Center for Theoretical Physics
- MIT Plasma Science and Fusion Center
- ML-1
- MNDO
- MNS matrix
- MOATA
- MOCADI
- MODTRAN
- MOPAC
- MOX fuel
- MPC&A
- MPRG Erlangen Division 3
- MSSM Higgs mass
- MSU Faculty of Physics
- MUSCL scheme
- MacCormack method
- MacDowell–Mansouri action
- Macedonio Melloni
- Mach's principle
- Mach bands
- Mach number
- Mach principle
- Mach reflection
- Mach tuck
- Mach wave
- Mache (unit)
- Macromolecular Chemistry and Physics
- Macromolecular Rapid Communications
- Macropore
- Macroscopic quantum self-trapping
- Macroscopic quantum phenomena
- Macroscopic quantum self-trapping
- Macroscopic quantum state
- Macroscopic scale
- Macrosonics
- Madelung constant
- Madelung equations
- Madison Symmetric Torus
- Magdeburg hemispheres
- Maggie Aderin-Pocock
- Magic angle
- Magic angle spinning
- Magic number (physics)
- Maglev wind turbine
- Magnecule
- Magnesium diboride
- Magnet
- Magnet wire
- Magnetar
- Magnetic Prandtl number
- Magnetic Resonance in Medicine
- Magnetic Reynolds number
- Magnetic anisotropy
- Magnetic anomaly detector
- Magnetic braking
- Magnetic capacitance
- Magnetic capacitivity
- Magnetic circuit
- Magnetic circular dichroism
- Magnetic complex impedance
- Magnetic confinement fusion
- Magnetic damping
- Magnetic deviation
- Magnetic diffusivity
- Magnetic dip
- Magnetic dipole
- Magnetic dipole–dipole interaction
- Magnetic domain
- Magnetic effective resistance
- Magnetic energy
- Magnetic evaporative cooling
- Magnetic field
- Magnetic field intensity
- Magnetic field viewing film
- Magnetic flow meter
- Magnetic flux
- Magnetic flux quantum
- Magnetic force microscope
- Magnetic form factor
- Magnetic helicity
- Magnetic hyperthermia
- Magnetic impedance
- Magnetic impurity
- Magnetic inductance
- Magnetic inductive coil
- Magnetic ionic liquid
- Magnetic isotope effect
- Magnetic lattice (accelerator)
- Magnetic lens
- Magnetic levitation
- Magnetic mirror
- Magnetic mirror point
- Magnetic moment
- Magnetic monopole
- Magnetic nanoparticles
- Magnetic particle imaging
- Magnetic photon
- Magnetic pole strength
- Magnetic pressure
- Magnetic properties
- Magnetic property
- Magnetic quantum number
- Magnetic reactance
- Magnetic reconnection
- Magnetic refrigeration
- Magnetic reluctance
- Magnetic resonance force microscopy
- Magnetic resonance imaging
- Magnetic sail
- Magnetic scalar potential
- Magnetic semiconductor
- Magnetic separation
- Magnetic structure
- Magnetic susceptibility
- Magnetic tension force
- Magnetic translation
- Magnetic vector potential
- Magnetic water treatment
- Magnetism
- Magnetization
- Magnetization dynamics
- Magnetization reversal by circularly polarized light
- Magnetization transfer
- Magnetized target fusion
- Magneto-optic Kerr effect
- Magneto-optic effect
- Magneto-optical trap
- Magnetoception
- Magnetochemistry
- Magnetocrystalline anisotropy
- Magnetogastrography
- Magnetogram
  - Solar magnetogram
- Magnetogravitic tensor
- Magnetogravity wave
- Magnetohydrodynamic drive
- Magnetohydrodynamics
- Magnetohydrodynamics (journal)
- Magnetometer
  - Magnetometer § Survey magnetometers
- Magnetomotive force
- Magnetopause
- Magnetoresistance
- Magnetorheological finishing
- Magnetorheological fluid
- Magnetorotational instability
- Magnetosome
- Magnetosphere
- Magnetosphere chronology
- Magnetosphere of Jupiter
- Magnetosphere particle motion
- Magnetospheric electric convection field
- Magnetospheric eternally collapsing object
- Magnetostatics
- Magnetostriction
- Magnetotactic bacteria
- Magnetotaxis
- Magnifying transmitter
- Magnitude (astronomy)
- Magnon
- Magnonics
- Magnus effect
- Mahmoud Hessabi
- Mains hum
- Mainz Microtron
- Major actinide
- Majorana Prize
- Majorana equation
- Majorana fermion
- Majoron
- Majumdar–Ghosh model
- Maki–Nakagawa–Sakata matrix
- Makoto Kobayashi (physicist)
- Malament–Hogarth spacetime
- Malcolm Beasley
- Malcolm Perry (physicist)
- Malleability
- Malter effect
- Mandelstam variables
- Mandrel wrapping
- Manfred R. Schroeder
- Manfred Wagner
- Manfred von Ardenne
- Manhattan Project
- Mani Lal Bhaumik
- Manifest covariance
- Manipulation of atoms by optical field
- Manne Siegbahn
- Manning formula
- Mannque Rho
- Mantle convection
- Manuel António Gomes
- Manuel Mateus Ventura
- Manuel Sandoval Vallarta
- Many-body problem
- Many-body theory
- Many-worlds interpretation
- Marangoni effect
- Marangoni number
- Marc-Auguste Pictet
- Marc A. Kastner
- Marc Henneaux
- Marcel Audiffren
- Marcel Brillouin
- Marcel Grossmann
- Marcel J. E. Golay
- Marcel Schein
- Marcela Carena
- Marcello Pirani
- Marcelo Damy
- Marcelo Gleiser
- Marchenko equation
- Marcia McNutt
- Marcia Neugebauer
- Marcos Moshinsky
- Marcus Birkenkrahe
- Marcus O'Day
- Marek Gazdzicki
- Marek Huberath
- Margaret Eliza Maltby
- Margaret Geller
- Margaret Hamilton (scientist)
- Margaret MacVicar
- Margaret Murnane
- Margaret Wertheim
- Margherita Hack
- Marginal stability
- Margolus–Levitin theorem
- Marguerite Perey
- Maria Ardinghelli
- Maria Goeppert-Mayer
- Maria Spiropulu
- Marian Danysz
- Marian Smoluchowski
- Mariano Gago
- Marie Alfred Cornu
- Marie Curie
- Marietta Blau
- Marijan Šunjić (physicist)
- Marin (wind)
- Marin Getaldić
- Marin Soljačić
- Mario Acuña
- Mario Ageno
- Mario Bunge
- Mario Garavaglia
- Mario Livio
- Mariotte's bottle
- Maritime Research Institute Netherlands
- Marjorie Williamson
- Mark Adler
- Mark B. Wise
- Mark Birkinshaw
- Mark Boslough
- Mark Buchanan
- Mark D. Maughmer
- Mark G. Kuzyk
- Mark G. Raizen
- Mark I (detector)
- Mark Inghram
- Mark Muir Mills
- Mark Newman
- Mark Oliphant
- Mark Reed (physicist)
- Mark Trodden
- Mark Welland
- Markus Aspelmeyer
- Markus Greiner
- Marlan Scully
- Marshall Rosenbluth
- Marshall Stoneham
- Martin A. Pomerantz
- Martin A. Uman
- Martin Bojowald
- Martin David Kruskal
- Martin Deutsch
- Martin Gutzwiller
- Martin Knudsen
- Martin Kutta
- Martin Lewis Perl
- Martin Lowry
- Martin Pope
- Martin Rees
- Martin Rocek
- Martin Ryle
- Martin Schadt
- Martin Walt
- Martin van Marum
- Martinus J. G. Veltman
- Marvin D. Girardeau
- Marvin L. Cohen
- Marvin Leonard Goldberger
- Mary K. Gaillard
- Masatoshi Koshiba
- Masatsugu Suzuki
- Masayuki Kikuchi
- Maser
- Mason equation
- Mass
- Mass-to-charge ratio
- Mass attenuation coefficient
- Mass chromatogram
- Mass concentration (astronomy)
- Mass distribution
- Mass flow
- Mass flow meter
- Mass flow rate
- Mass flow sensor
- Mass flux
- Mass gap
- Mass generation
- Mass in general relativity
- Mass in special relativity
- Mass matrix
- Mass number
- Mass properties
- Mass ratio
- Mass segregation
- Mass spectrometry
- Mass spectrometry data format
- Mass spectrum
- Mass transfer
- Massimo Porrati
- Massive compact halo object
- Massive gravity
- Massive particle
- Massless particle
- Mass–energy equivalence
- Mass–luminosity relation
- Master equation
- Masud Ahmad
- Material derivative
- Material dispersion coefficient
- Material physics
- Material point method
- Material properties (thermodynamics)
- Materials (journal)
- Materials Chemistry and Physics
- Materials Research Science and Engineering Centers
- Materials Science Citation Index
- Materials Science and Engineering R
- Materials and Structures
- Materials science
- Materials testing reactor
- Mathematical descriptions of opacity
- Mathematical descriptions of physical laws
- Mathematical descriptions of the electromagnetic field
- Mathematical formulation of quantum mechanics
- Mathematical models in physics
- Mathematical physics
- Mathematical universe hypothesis
- Mathematics of general relativity
- Mathias Fink
- Mathieu transformation
- Matrix-assisted laser desorption/ionization
- Matrix isolation
- Matrix mechanics
- Matrix string theory
- Matrix theory (physics)
- Mats Hillert
- Mattauch isobar rule
- Matter
- Matter-dominated era
- Matter wave
- Matthew Kleban
- Matthew Koss
- Matthew Luckiesh
- Matthew Sands
- Matthias Staudacher
- Mattis–Bardeen theory
- Matvei Petrovich Bronstein
- Maupertuis' principle
- Maurice Allais
- Maurice Anthony Biot
- Maurice Couette
- Maurice Ewing
- Maurice Goldhaber
- Maurice Hill (geophysicist)
- Maurice Karnaugh
- Maurice Pryce
- Maurice Wilkes
- Maurice Wilkins
- Maurice de Broglie
- Mauritius Renninger
- Maw-Kuen Wu
- Max Abraham
- Max Born
- Max Born Award
- Max Cosyns
- Max Delbrück
- Max G. Lagally
- Max Jammer
- Max Krook
- Max Perutz
- Max Planck
- Max Planck Institute for Biophysics
- Max Planck Institute of Microstructure Physics
- Max Planck Institute for Nuclear Physics
- Max Planck Institute for the Science of Light
- Max Planck Institute of Plasma Physics
- Max Planck Medal
- Max Q
- Max Steenbeck
- Max Tegmark
- Max Trautz
- Max Valier
- Max Wien
- Max von Laue
- Maximilian Hell
- Maximilien Toepler
- Maximum bubble pressure method
- Maximum density
- Maximum entropy probability distribution
- Maximum entropy thermodynamics
- Maximum power transfer theorem
- Maximum sustained wind
- Maximus von Imhof
- Maxwell's demon
- Maxwell's equations
- Maxwell's equations in curved spacetime
- Maxwell's thermodynamic surface
- Maxwell–Bloch equations
- Maxwell bridge
- Maxwell coil
- Maxwell construction
- Maxwell material
- Maxwell relations
- Maxwell speed distribution
- Maxwell stress tensor
- Maxwell–Boltzmann distribution
- Maxwell–Boltzmann statistics
- Maxwell–Stefan diffusion
- Maxwell–Wagner–Sillars polarization
- Mayak
- Mazuku
- McCumber relation
- McLeod gauge
- McStas
- Mean anomaly
- Mean field theory
- Mean flow
- Mean free path
- Mean free time
- Mean inter-particle distance
- Mean radiant temperature
- Measure-preserving dynamical system
- Measure (physics)
- Measurement
- Measurement Science and Technology
- Measurement in quantum mechanics
- Measurement problem
- Measurement uncertainty
- Measurements of neutrino speed
- Mechanical advantage
- Mechanical efficiency
- Mechanical energy
- Mechanical equilibrium
- Mechanical equivalent of heat
- Mechanical explanations of gravitation
- Mechanical filter
- Mechanical metamaterial
- Mechanical probe station
- Mechanical resonance
- Mechanical similarity
- Mechanical singularity
- Mechanical splice
- Mechanical traveller
- Mechanical wave
- Mechanician
- Mechanics
- Mechanics of structures
- Mechanoluminescence
- Mediator family
- Medical physics
- Medical radiography
- Medical ultrasonography
- Medium Energy Ion Scattering Facility
- Medium frequency
- MeerKAT
- Mega Ampere Spherical Tokamak
- Megalethoscope
- Megasonic cleaning
- Megatsunami
- Megavoltage X-rays
- Meghnad Saha
- Mehdi Golshani
- Mehran Kardar
- Meinhard E. Mayer
- Meissner effect
- Meissner state
- Meissner–Ochsenfeld effect
- Meitner–Hupfeld effect
- Melba Phillips
- Melde's experiment
- Melissa Franklin
- Melting
- Melting point
- Melville S. Green
- Melvin B. Gottlieb
- Melvin Lax
- Melvin Mooney
- Melvin Schwartz
- Membrane-introduction mass spectrometry
- Membrane (M-theory)
- Membrane analogy
- Membrane mirror
- Membrane paradigm
- Memristor
- Menas Kafatos
- Mendel Sachs
- Mendeleev's predicted elements
- Meniscus (liquid)
- Menyhért Palágyi
- Mercury-in-glass thermometer
- Mercury laser
- Merle Randall
- Merle Tuve
- Mermin–Wagner theorem
- Meron (physics)
- Merrill Skolnik
- Meshfree methods
- Mesocrystal
- Mesogen
- Meson
- Meson spectroscopy
- Mesonic molecule
- Mesoscopic
- Mesoscopic physics
- Mesoscopic scale
- Meta-material cloak
- Meta-materials cloak
- Meta material
- Meta materials
- Metadynamics
- Metafluid dynamics
- Metal
- Metal-induced gap states
- Metal K-edge
- Metal L-edge
- Metalizing
- Metallic crystal
- Metallic hydrogen
- Metallic microlattice
- Metallicity
- Metallizing
- Metal–insulator transition
- Metamagnetism
- Metamaterial
- Metamaterial absorber
- Metamaterial antenna
- Metamaterial antennas
- Metamaterial cloaking
- Metamaterial cloaking device
- Metamaterial cloaking devices
- Metamaterial cover
- Metamaterial invisibility
- Metamaterial lens
- Metamaterial microwave cloak
- Metamaterials
- Metamaterials: Physics and Engineering Explorations
- Metamaterials: physics and engineering explorations
- Metamaterials: physics and engineering explorations.
- Metamaterials (journal)
- Metamaterials Handbook
- Metamaterials cloak
- Metamaterials cloaking
- Metamaterials cloaking device
- Metamaterials cloaking devices
- Metamaterials invisibility
- Metamaterials physics and engineering explorations
- Metamaterials physics and engineering explorations.
- Metastability
- Meteoritical Society
- Meteorology
- Meteosat visible and infrared imager
- Meteotsunami
- Metering pump
- Methane clathrate
- Method of characteristics
- Method of image charges
- Method of images
- Methods of detecting extrasolar planets
- Metre per second squared
- Metric signature
- Metric system
- Metric tensor (general relativity)
- Metrogon
- Metrologia
- Metropolis light transport
- Michael A. O'Keefe
- Michael Aizenman
- Michael Atiyah
- Michael Berry (physicist)
- Michael Coey
- Michael Creutz
- Michael Duff (physicist)
- Michael F. Shlesinger
- Michael Faraday
- Michael Fisher
- Michael Foale
- Michael Green (physicist)
- Michael H. Hart
- Michael Heller (professor/priest)
- Michael Hochberg
- Michael Kelly (physicist)
- Michael L. W. Thewalt
- Michael Levitt
- Max Munk
- Michael McKubre
- Michael Pepper
- Michael Perrin
- Michael Peskin
- Michael R. Anastasio
- Michael R. Douglas
- Michael Radaković
- Michael Rossmann
- Michael Rowan-Robinson
- Michael S. Longuet-Higgins
- Michael Schoenberg
- Michael Tinkham
- Michael Turner (cosmologist)
- Michael Woolfson
- Michal Lipson
- Michał Heller
- Michał Horodecki
- Michel Ter-Pogossian
- Michel parameters
- Michele Besso
- Michele Mosca
- Michele Parrinello
- Michelson interferometer
- Michelson stellar interferometer
- Michelson–Gale–Pearson experiment
- Michelson–Morley experiment
- Michiel B.M. van der Klis
- Michio Kaku
- Micro-g environment
- Micro-pulling-down
- MicroFUN
- MicroMegas detector
- Micro SPIDER
- Micro black hole
- Micro perforated plate
- Microactuator
- Microbarom
- Microbarometer
- Microbolometer
- Microburst
- Microcanonical ensemble
- Microchannel plate detector
- Microcosm (CERN)
- Microelectromechanical system oscillator
- Microfluidics
- Microlensing Observations in Astrophysics
- Microlift glider
- Micromagnetics
- Microphotonics
- Microphysics
- Microplasticity
- Microquasar
- Microrheology
- Microscope
- Microscopic scale
- Microscopy Society of America
- Microstate (statistical mechanics)
- Microstate continuum
- Microtron
- Microviscosity
- Microvoid coalescence
- Microwave
- Microwave-metamaterial cloak
- Microwave Imaging Radiometer with Aperture Synthesis
- Microwave Theory and Techniques, IEEE Transactions on
- Microwave and Guided Wave Letters
- Microwave and Guided Wave Letters, IEEE
- Microwave and Optical Technology Letters
- Microwave engineering
- Microwave link
- Microwave metamaterial cloak
- Microwave plasma
- Microwave power transmission
- Microwave radio relay
- Microwave radiometer
- Microwave transmission
- Mictomagnetism
- Middle World
- Mie scattering
- Mieczysław Wolfke
- Migma
- Miguel A. Fernández Sanjuán
- Miguel Alcubierre
- Miguel Ángel Virasoro (physicist)
- Miguel José Yacamán
- Mihail Roco
- Mihajlo Idvorski Pupin
- Mihalis Dafermos
- Mike Morris (physicist)
- Mikhail Kovalchuk
- Mikhail Lavrentyev
- Mikhail Lomonosov
- Mikhail Molodenskii
- Mikhail Ostrogradsky
- Mikhail Sadovsky
- Mikhail Shifman
- Mikhail Shultz
- Mikheyev–Smirnov–Wolfenstein effect
- Milagro (experiment)
- Milan Damnjanović (physicist)
- Milan Kurepa
- Milan Vukcevich
- Mild-slope equation
- Mildred Allen
- Mildred Dresselhaus
- Milesian school
- Mileva Marić
- Millennium Prize Problems
- Millennium Run
- Miller index
- Millisecond pulsar
- Milne model
- Miloslav Valouch
- Milton A. Rothman
- Milton Feng
- Milton S. Livingston
- Milton S. Plesset
- Milton Van Dyke
- Milutin Milanković
- Mineral physics
- Minh Quang Tran
- Mini-magnetospheric plasma propulsion
- MiniBooNE
- MiniGrail
- Miniature neutron source reactor
- Minimal Supersymmetric Standard Model
- Minimal models
- Minimal subtraction scheme
- Minimum Ionizing Particle
- Minimum audibility curve
- Minimum deviation
- Minimum total potential energy principle
- Minkowski diagram
- Minkowski space
- Minkowski–Bouligand dimension
- Minority interpretations of quantum mechanics
- Minto wheel
- Minuano
- Minute Physics
- Mioara Mugur-Schächter
- Mir (lens)
- Mirage of astronomical objects
- Mirau interferometer
- Miroslav Žamboch
- Mirror
- Mirror Fusion Test Facility
- Mirror furnace
- Mirror matter
- Mirror photon
- Mirror symmetry (string theory)
- Misalignment mechanism
- Misner space
- Missile Datcom
- Missing energy
- Mist
- Mistral (wind)
- Misnay–Schardin effect
- Mitchell Feigenbaum
- Mitsutaka Fujita
- Mixed/dual cycle
- Mixed anomaly
- Mixed dark matter
- Mixing (physics)
- Mixing length model
- Mixing paradox
- Mixing ratio
- Mixmaster dynamics
- Mixmaster universe
- Mixture theory
- Mm'-type filter
- MoEDAL experiment
- MoL
- Mobile Anisotropy Telescope
- Mode-locking
- Mode-stirred chamber
- Mode volume
- Model building (particle physics)
- Model photosphere
- Model solid approximation
- Modelling and Simulation in Materials Science and Engineering
- Modern Physics and Ancient Faith
- Modern physics
- Modern searches for Lorentz violation
- Modified Newtonian dynamics
- Modified models of gravity
- Modular Neutron Array
- Modular invariance
- Modular ocean model
- Modulated ultrasound
- Modulation sphere
- Modulational instability
- Moduli (physics)
- Moens–Korteweg equation
- Moffat distribution
- Mohammad Aslam Khan Khalil
- Mohammad Khorrami (physicist)
- Mohr's circle
- Mohsen Fakhrizadeh
- Moire deflectometry
- Moiré pattern
- Moisey Markov
- Moisture sorption isotherm
- Mole (unit)
- Molecular Hamiltonian
- Molecular Physics (journal)
- Molecular beam
- Molecular beam epitaxy
- Molecular chaos
- Molecular diffusion
- Molecular dipole moment
- Molecular dynamics
- Molecular electronic transducers
- Molecular field
- Molecular mechanics
- Molecular motor
- Molecular orbital
- Molecular physics
- Molecular radiation
- Molecular scale electronics
- Molecular sieve
- Molecular tagging velocimetry
- Molecular term symbol
- Molecular vibration
- Molecule
- Molecule-based magnets
- Molière radius
- Molniya orbit
- Molten-Salt Reactor Experiment
- Molten salt reactor
- Moment (physics)
- Moment map
- Moment of inertia
- Momentum
- Momentum diffusion
- Momentum operator
- Momentum space
- Momentum theory
- Momentum thickness
- Momentum transfer
- Monatomic gas
- Monin–Obukhov length
- Monochromatic electromagnetic plane wave
- Monoclinic crystal system
- Monocular
- Monoisotopic mass
- Monolayer
- Monopole, Astrophysics and Cosmic Ray Observatory
- Monster (physics)
- Monte Carlo N-Particle Transport Code
- Monte Carlo method
- Monte Carlo method in statistical physics
- Montonen–Olive duality
- Montreal Laboratory
- Moo-Young Han
- Moody chart
- Moon dog
- Moonbow
- Mooney–Rivlin solid
- Moonlight
- Mordehai Milgrom
- Morikazu Toda
- Morison equation
- Morphology-dependent resonance
- Morse potential
- Morten Bo Madsen
- Morton Gurtin
- Morton number
- Moseley's law
- Moses Blackman
- Moses H. W. Chan
- Moshe Shapiro
- Motion-triggered contact insufficiency
- Motion (physics)
- Motion graphs and derivatives
- Motional narrowing
- Motionless electromagnetic generator
- Motonori Matuyama
- Mott insulator
- Mott problem
- Mott scattering
- Mott transition
- Mottness
- Mousetrap car
- Moving frame
- Moving magnet and conductor problem
- Moving shock
- Moyal bracket
- Mpemba effect
- Mu problem
- Mueller calculus
- Muffin-tin approximation
- Muhammad Hafeez Qureshi
- Multi-angle light scattering
- Multi-configuration time-dependent Hartree
- Multi-configurational self-consistent field
- Multi-object APO Radial Velocity Exoplanet Large-area Survey
- Multi-wavelength anomalous dispersion
- Multiangle light scattering
- Multiferroics
- Multipaction
- Multipactor effect
- Multipath interference
- Multiphase flow
- Multiphoton lithography
- Multiphysics
- Multiphysics Methods Group
- Multiple-scale analysis
- Multiple histories
- Multiple isomorphous replacement
- Multiplet
- Multiplicative quantum number
- Multipole expansion
- Multipole moment
- Multipurpose Applied Physics Lattice Experiment
- Multiscale modeling
- Multiverse
- Muneer Ahmad Rashid
- Munir Ahmad Khan
- Munir Nayfeh
- Munroe effect
- Muon
- Muon-catalyzed fusion
- Muon capture
- Muon collider
- Muon neutrino
- Muonium
- Murray Batchelor
- Murray Gell-Mann
- Museum of Optical Technologies
- Mushroom cloud
- Musical acoustics
- My Inventions: The Autobiography of Nikola Tesla
- Myriam Sarachik
- Myron L. Good
- Myron Samuel Malkin
- Mysterious duality
- Mária Telkes
- Mário Schenberg
- Mössbauer effect
- Mössbauer spectroscopy
- Møller scattering
- Mārcis Auziņš
