= Destouches =

Destouches is a surname. Notable people with the surname include:

- André Cardinal Destouches, French composer of Les élémens
- Franz Seraph von Destouches, German composer
- Louis-Camus Destouches, artillery officer and father of Jean le Rond d'Alembert
- Louis-Ferdinand Destouches, better known as Louis-Ferdinand Céline
- Lucette Destouches (1912–2019), French dancer, wife of Céline
- Paulette Destouches-Février (1914–2013), French philosopher and mathematician
- Philippe Néricault Destouches, French dramatist
- Charles René Dominique Sochet, Chevalier Destouches, French admiral

== See also ==
- Claude Desouches (1911–2001), French sailor
