= Cold Atom Laboratory =

Experimental instrument on board the ISS

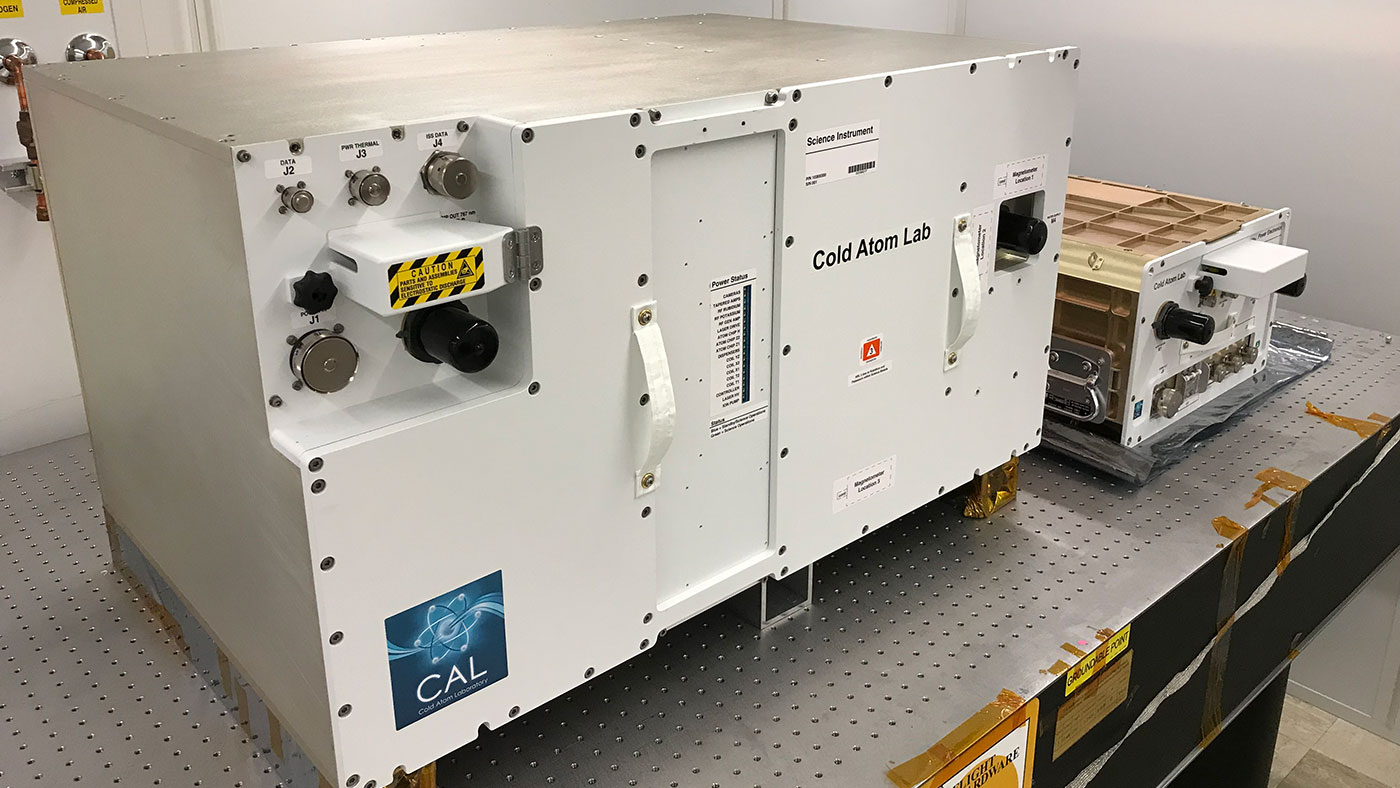
The Cold Atom Laboratory machine in a testing rig

The Cold Atom Laboratory (CAL) is an experimental instrument on board the ISS, which launched in 2018. It creates an extremely cold environment in microgravity in order to study behaviour of atoms in these conditions.

== Timeline ==
The CAL was developed at JPL in Pasadena, California. It was originally scheduled for launch to the International Space Station (ISS) in June 2017. It was then delayed until a scheduled launch on a SpaceX CRS-12 rocket in August 2017. It was finally launched on May 21, 2018. The initial mission had a duration of 12 months with up to five years of extended operation.

In January 2020 it underwent hardware upgrades, which were carried out over an eight-day period by astronauts Christina Koch and Jessica Meir under the supervision of ground controllers. The upgrade included an atom interferometer which can be used to study the equivalence principle.

In July 2021, another upgrade by astronaut Megan McArthur gave CAL the ability to work with ultracold potassium atoms in addition to rubidium atoms.

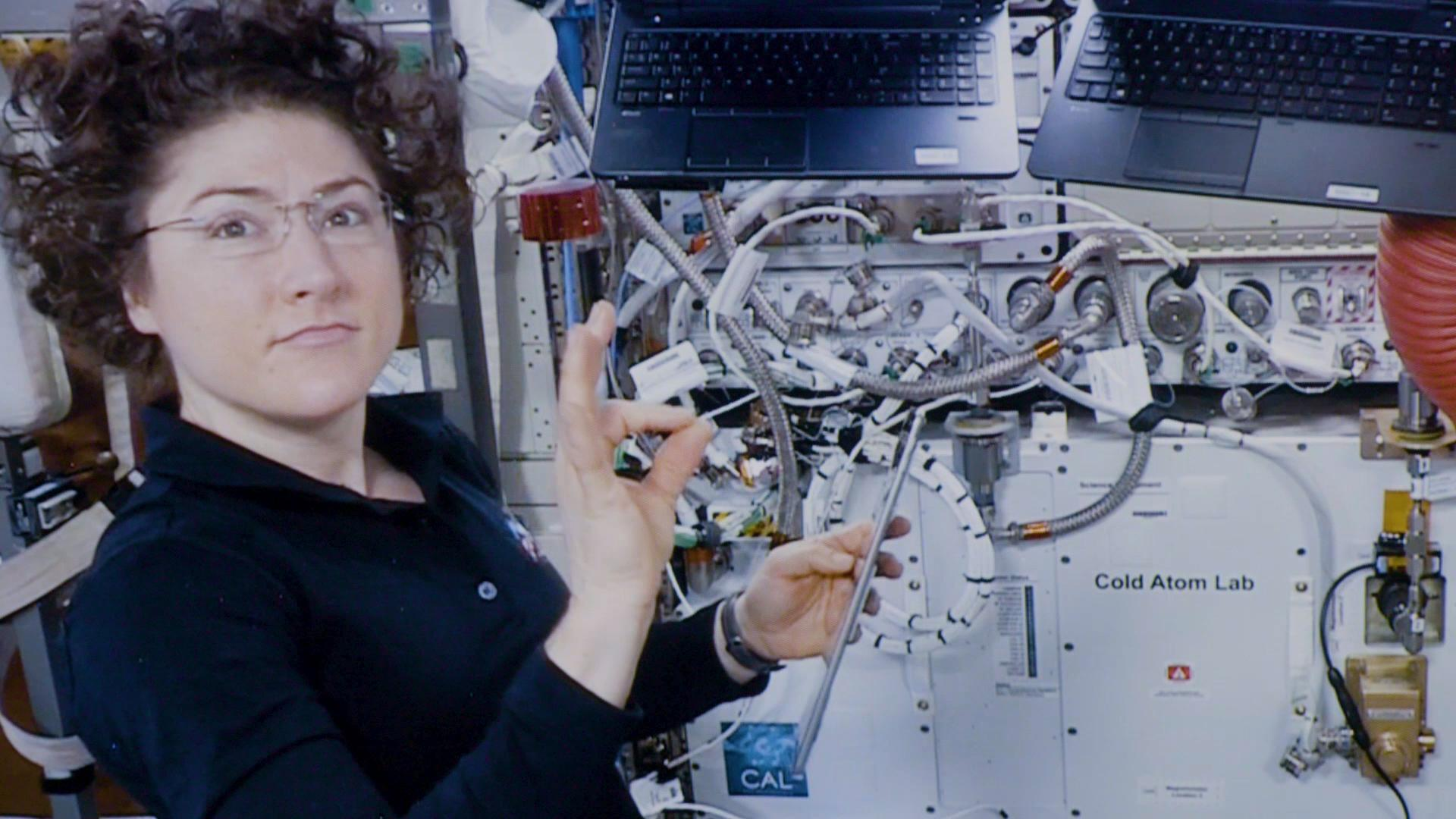
Christina Koch next to the Cold Atom Laboratory on board the ISS in January 2020

== Purpose ==
The instrument creates extremely cold conditions in the microgravity environment of the ISS, leading to the formation of Bose Einstein Condensates (BECs) that are orders of magnitude colder than those that are created in laboratories on Earth. In a space-based laboratory, up to 10 seconds interaction times and as low as 1 picokelvin temperatures are achievable, and it could lead to exploration of unknown quantum mechanical phenomena and test some of the most fundamental laws of physics. These experiments are best done in a freely falling environment, because it is more conducive to uninhibited formation of BECs. Ground based experiments suffer from the effect of the condensate interacting asymmetrically with the apparatus, interfering with the time evolution of the condensate. In orbit, experiments can last much longer because freefall is sustained indefinitely. NASA's JPL scientists state that the CAL investigation could advance knowledge in the development of extremely sensitive quantum detectors, which could be used for monitoring the gravity of Earth and other planetary bodies, or for building advanced navigation devices.

== Results ==
The results of the experiments from 2019 were reported in 2020, demonstrating successful operation of the laboratory. This enables improved research of BECs and quantum mechanics, since physics are scaled to macroscopic scales in BECs. The lab supports long-term investigations of few-body physics, and supports the development of techniques for atom-wave interferometry and atom lasers.

== See also ==
- Bose–Einstein correlations
- Bose–Einstein condensation: a network theory approach
- Bose–Einstein condensation of excitons
- Macroscopic quantum phenomena
- Macroscopic quantum self-trapping
- Slow light
- Timeline of low-temperature technology
