= Duty Entitlement Pass Book =

DEPB (Duty Entitlement Pass Book ) is an export incentive scheme of Indian Government provided to Exporters in India.

Duty Entitlement Pass Book Scheme (DEPB) is an export incentive scheme. The objective of DEPB is to neutralise the incidence of Customs duty on the import content of the export product. The neutralisation shall be provided by way of grant of duty credit against the export product. Under the DEPB, an exporter may apply for credit, as a specified percentage of FOB value of exports made in freely convertible currency.

Notified on 1/4/1997, the DEPB Scheme consisted of (a) Post-export DEPB and (b) Pre-export DEPB. The pre-export DEPB scheme was abolished w.e.f. 1/4/2000. Under the post-export DEPB, which is issued after exports, the exporter is given a duty entitlement Pass Book Scheme at a pre-determined credit on the FOB value. The DEPB rates allows import of any items except the items which are otherwise restricted for imports. Items such as Gold Nibs, Gold Pen, Gold watches etc. though covered under the generic description of writing instruments, components of writing instruments and watches are thus not eligible for benefit under the DEPB scheme.

The DEPB Rates are applied on the basis of FOB value or value cap whichever is lower. For example, if the FOB value is Rs.700/- per piece, and the value cap is Rs.500/- per piece, the DEPB rate shall be applied on Rs.500/-. The DEPB rate and the value cap shall be applicable as existing on the date of exports as defined in paragraph 15.15 of Handbook (Vol.1).

DEPB Scheme is issued only on post-export basis and pre/export DEPB Scheme has been discontinued. The provisions of DEPB Scheme are mentioned in Para 4.3 and 4.3.1 to 4.3.5 of the Foreign Trade Policy or Exim Policy. One significant change in the new DEPB Scheme is that in terms of Para 4.3.5 of the Exim Policy even excise duty paid in cash on inputs used in the manufacture of export product shall be eligible for brand rate of duty drawback as per rules framed by Department of Revenue which was not mentioned in the earlier DEPB Scheme.

== Benefits of DEPB Rates ==
The benefit of DEPB schemes is available on the export products having extraneous material up to 8% by material up to 5% shall be ignored and the DEPB rate as notified for that export product is to be allowed.

== Review of DEPB Rates ==
The Government of India review the DEPB rates after getting the appropriate an export import data on FOB (shipping) value of exports and Cost, Insurance and Freight (CIF) value of inputs used in the export product, as per SION. Such data and information is usually obtained from the concerned Export Promotion Councils.

== Implementation of the DEPB Rates ==
Some additional facilities as listed below have been provided for better implementation of the DEPB Rates

- DEPB rates rationalized to account for the changes in Customs duties.
- Caps fixed on certain items but there would be no verification of Present Market Value (PMV) on such items.
- A number of ports have been added for availing facilities under the Duty Exemption Scheme, including DEPB.
- The threshold limit of Rs. 200 million for fixing new DEPB rates removed.

=== Provisional DEPB Rate ===
The main objective behind the provisional DEPB rates is to encourage diversification and to promote export of new products. However, provisional DEPB rates would be valid for a limited period of time during which exporter would furnish data on export and import for regular fixation of rates.

=== Maintenance of Record ===
It is necessary for Custom House at ports to maintain a separate record of details of exports made under DEPB Schemes.

=== Port of Registration ===
The exports/imports made from the specified ports given shall be entitled for DEPB.

- Sea Ports: Mumbai, Kolkata, Cochin, Dahej, Kakinada, Kandla, Mangalore, Mormugao, Mundra, Chennai, Nhava Sheva, Paradeep, Pipavav, Sikka, Tuticorin Vishakhapatnam, Surat (Magdalla), Nagapattinam, Okha, Dharamtar and Jamnagar.
- Airports: Ahmedabad, Bangalore, Bhubaneshwar Mumbai, Kolkata Coimbatore Air Cargo Complex, Cochin, Delhi, Hyderabad, Jaipur, Srinagar, Trivandrum, Varanasi, Nagpur and Chennai.
- ICDs : Agra, Ahmedabad, Bangalore, Bhiwadi, Coimbatore, Daulatabad, (Wanjarwadi and Maliwada), Delhi, Dighi (Pune), Faridabad, Guntur, Hyderabad, Jaipur, Jallandhar, Jodhpur, Kanpur, Kota, Ludhiana, Madurai and the land Customs station at Ranaghat Mallanpur, Moradabad, Meerut Nagpur, Nasik, Gauhati (Amingaon), Pimpri (Pune), Pitampur (Indore), Rudrapur (Nainital), Salem Singanalur, Surat, Tirupur, Udaipur, Vadodara, Varanasi, Waluj, Bhilwara, Pondicherry, Garhi-Harsaru, Bhatinda, Dappar, Chheharata (Amritsar), Karur, Miraj and Rewari.
- LCS: Ranaghat, Singhabad, Raxaul, Jogbani, Nautanva ( Sonauli), Petrapole and Mahadipur.

The exports made to the following Special Economic Zones (SEZ) are also entitled to DEPB.

- SEZ : Santacruz, Kandla, Kochi, Vishakhapatnam, Chennai, FALTA, Surat, NOIDA

=== Credit under DEPB and Present Market Value ===
In respect of products where rate of credit entitlement under DEPB Scheme comes to 10% or more, amount of credit against each such export product shall not exceed 50% of Present Market Value (PMV) of export product. During export, exporter shall declare on shipping bill that benefit under DEPB Scheme would not exceed 50% of PMV of export product.

However PMV declaration shall not be applicable for products for which value cap exists irrespective of DEPB rate of product.

=== Utilization of DEPB credit ===
Credit given under DEPB Schemes is utilized for payment of Indian customs duty

=== Re-export of goods imported under DEPB Scheme ===
In case of return of any exported goods, which has been found defective or unfit for use may be again exported according to the exim guidelines as mentioned by the Department of Revenue.

In such cases 98% of the credit amount debited against DEPB for the export of such goods is generated by the concerned Commissioner of Customs in the form of a Certificate, containing the amount generated and the details of the original DEPB. On the basis of certificate, a fresh DEPB is issued by the concerned DGFT Regional Authority. The issued DEPB have the same port of registration and shall be valid for a period equivalent to the balance period available on the date of import of such defective/unfit goods.

=== Closure of DEPB Scheme ===
DEPB scheme has been withdrawn since October 2015.. The scheme was phased out following a 2011 ruling by the World Trade Organization which found that DEPB, along with several other Indian export incentive schemes, constituted prohibited export subsidies under the WTO Agreement on Subsidies and Countervailing Measures. The Government of India replaced DEPB with the Merchandise Exports from India Scheme (MEIS) under the Foreign Trade Policy 2015-2020, which adopted a different structure of incentives aimed at WTO compliance. MEIS was itself subsequently replaced by the Remission of Duties and Taxes on Exported Products (RoDTEP) scheme, which came into effect on 1 January 2021.
