= Mohammad Khorrami =

Mohammad Khorrami may refer to:

- Mohammad Khorrami (physicist)
- Mohammad Khorrami (wrestler)
