= LISE++ =

- LISE^{++} in action. Physical Calculator utility
- Developer: LISE^{++} group @ FRIB / MSU
- Stable release: 16.17.28 / August 28, 2023; 2 years ago
- Written in: C++
- Operating system: Microsoft Windows
- Type: Simulation software
- License: Freeware; LISE^{++} user license
- Website: lise.nscl.msu.edu

The program LISE^{++} is designed to predict the intensity and purity of radioactive ion beams (RIB) produced by In-flight separators. LISE^{++} also facilitates the tuning of experiments where its results can be quickly compared to on-line data. The program is constantly expanding and evolving from the feedback of its users around the world.

== Description ==
The aim of LISE^{++} is to simulate the production of RIBs via some type of nuclear reactions (several are available in the program), between a beam of stable isotopes and a target. The program simulates the characteristics of the nuclear reactions based on well-established models, as well as the effects of the filtering device located downstream of the target used to create the RIBs.

The LISE^{++} name is borrowed from the well known evolution of the C programming language, and is meant to indicate that the program is no longer limited to a fixed configuration like it was in the original “LISE” program, but can be configured to match any type of device or add to an existing device using the concept of modular blocks.

Many physical phenomena are incorporated in this program, from reaction mechanism models, cross section systematics, electron stripping models, energy loss models to beam optics, just to list a few. The references for the calculations are available within the program itself (see the various option windows) and the user is encouraged to consult them for detailed information. The interface and algorithms are designed to provide a user-friendly environment allowing easy adjustments of the input parameters and quick calculations.

== Application ==
The ability to predict as well as identify on-line the composition of RIBs is of prime importance. This has shaped the main functions of the program:

- predict the fragment separator settings necessary to obtain a specific RIB;
- predict the intensity and purity of the chosen RIB;
- simulate identification plots for on-line comparison;
- provide a highly user-friendly graphical environment;
- allow configuration for different fragment separators.

The LISE^{++} package includes configuration files for most of the existing fragment and recoil separators found in the world (examples of fragment separators whose configurations are available in LISE^{++}). Projectile fragmentation, fusion–evaporation, fusion–fission, Coulomb fission, abrasion–fission and two body nuclear reactions models are included in this program and can be used as the production reaction mechanism to simulate experiments at beam energies above the Coulomb barrier.

LISE^{++} can be used not only to forecast the yields and purities of radioactive beams, but also as an on-line tool for beam identification and tuning during experiments. Large progress has recently been done in ion-beam optics with the introduction of "elemental" blocks, that allows optical matrices calculation within LISE^{++}. New type of configurations based on these blocks allow a detailed analysis of the transmission, useful for fragment separator design, and can be used for optics optimization based on user constraints.

It can be configured to simulate the fragment separators of various research institutes by means of configuration files.

== Utilities ==
Many “satellite” tools have been incorporated into the LISE^{++} framework, which are accessible with buttons on the main toolbar and include:

- Physical calculator
- Relativistic Kinematics calculator
- Evaporation calculator
- Radiation Residue Calculator
- Units converter
- ISOL catcher utility
- Nuclide and Isomeric state Databases utilities
- Units converter
- Stripper foil lifetime utility
- The program PACE4 (fusion-evaporation code) by A. Gavron et al.
- Spectrometric calculator by J. Kantele
- The program CHARGE (charge state distribution code) by Th. Stöhlker et al.
- The program GLOBAL (charge-state distribution code) by W. E. Meyerhof et al.
- The program BI (search for 2-dimensional peaks)
- MOTER by H. A. Thiessen et al.: raytracing code with optimization capabilities operating under MS Windows

== See also ==
=== Examples of Fragment separators at LISE++ ===
- A1900 @ NSCL/MSU (USA)
- LISE @ GANIL (France)
- FRS @ GSI (Germany)
- BigRIPS & RIPS @ RIBF/RIKEN (Japan)
- Accullina @ JINR (Russia)

=== Simulation programs used to calculate the transport of ion beams ===
- MOCADI
- Beam TRANSPORT code
- COSY INFINITY
