= Angular rate sensor =

Devices that directly measure angular rate

Angular rate sensors, ARS, are devices that directly measure angular rate, without integration in conditioning electronics. Gyroscopes also measure angular rate. Generally gyroscopes are able to measure a constant rotation rate, while rate sensors also include devices with a low cut off frequency that is other than zero.

== Technologies ==
Main technologies for rate sensors:

- Electromechanical (various types)
- Vibrating structure gyroscopes, including MEMS gyroscopes
- Ring laser gyroscopes
- Fibre optic gyroscopes
- MHD sensors, based on the magnetohydrodynamic effect
- Electrochemical sensors (based on molecular electronic transducer (MET) technology)

=== MET sensors ===
There are two types of MET rate sensors that directly measure angular rate: one that is able to measure constant angular rate (DC sensitive) and one that is not.

A non–DC-sensitive angular rate sensor consists of a toroid filled with a special electrolyte that moves when the device is rotated about its measurement axis. When this happens the electrolyte flows through the sensing element, which is rigidly fixed inside the channel, and the motion is detected. The output signal is proportional to the angular rate due to internal integration that occurs inside of the sensing element. The cutoff frequency for measurements can be as low as 0.005 Hz.

A DC-sensitive angular rate sensor or gyroscope has a more complex design and uses measurement of Coriolis acceleration to determine angular rate.

== Uses ==
Angular rate sensors are used in a variety of applications including vehicle handling, crash, biomechanics, and high-rate ballistics testing. Modern cars typically contain a Yaw-rate sensor which determines how far off-axis a car is "tilting" in a turn.
