= Mioara Mugur-Schächter =

French physicist (born 1929)

- Born: Mioara Iscovici; 1929 (age 96–97); Romania
- Scientific career
- Fields: Physics; Epistemology; Philosophy
- Thesis: Étude du caractère complet de la théorie quantique
- Doctoral advisor: Louis de Broglie

Mioara Mugur-Schächter (née Iscovici, born 1929) is a French-Romanian physicist specialized in the foundations of quantum mechanics, probability theory, and theory of communication of information. She is also an epistemologist. As a professor at the University of Reims, she founded there the Laboratoire de Mécanique Quantique et Structures de l'Information, which she directed until 1997.

== Education ==
After completing her undergraduate studies in physics and becoming part of the first nuclear physics group in the Socialist Republic of Romania, she traveled to France in 1962 to begin her PhD at the Sorbonne under Louis de Broglie. In her PhD thesis "Étude du caractère complet de la théorie quantique", she worked a formal argument to invalidate John von Neumann's no hidden variables proof, published in 1964, two years before John Bell's famous invalidation paper. Her invalidation argument was later cited by various authors including Bell himself. Her refutation was inspired by previous work by Paulette Destouches-Février on von Neumann's proof.

== Work ==
In the 1980s her work on relativized conceptualization of quantum mechanics sought a unified mathematical description combining probabilistic and informational approaches. Her work included challenges to the Copenhagen interpretation of quantum mechanics as insufficiently defining its concept of probability. Her approach to these problems formalized the propensity approach to probability of Karl Popper.

In the 1990s she organized a working group (Centre d'études pour la synthèse d'une épistémologie formelle) in French epistemological circles and edited a book collecting epistemologic studies including contributions from notable figures such as Michel Paty, Jean Petitot, Michel Bitbol, Giuseppe Longo, and others.

Mugur-Schächter's work was listed in a 1992 "Bibliography on quantum logics and related structures". Her work has been described as a form of relativistic quantum logic, a way of combining the concepts of Hilbert space and Lorentzian spacetime to create a quantum logic subject to special relativity but with explicit concepts of signaling.

In 2011, Mugur-Schächter organized a debate on the concepts of randomness, statistics and probability with Maria Luisa Dalla Chiara, Cristian Calude, Giuseppe Longo and Cristian Calude, that was published as part of a special issue of Mathematical Structures in Computer Science.
