= EOU =

EOU may refer to:

- Eastern Oregon University, in La Grande, Oregon
- Encyclopedia of Ukraine
- Enemy Objectives Unit of the United States Office of Strategic Services during World War II
- Export-Oriented Unit, a type of special economic zone in India; see Domestic tariff area
