= Mark Cladis =

American professor and author

- Education: University of California, Santa Barbara; Princeton University

Mark S. Cladis is an author and the Brooke Russell Astor Professor of the Humanities at Brown University. Since arriving at Brown in 2004, he served as Chair for several 3-year terms. His teaching and scholarship are located at the various intersections of religious studies, philosophy, and environmental humanities. He has published five books. His newest book is Radical Romanticism: Democracy, Religion, and the Environmental Imagination (Columbia University Press, 2025). His next book project, Just Home: Place, Belonging, and Justice, explores how concepts of “home” shape our political and ecological lives—how belonging can either sustain exclusion or deepen our sense of shared responsibility. He has also published over seventy-five articles, essays, and chapters in edited books.

Raised in Stanford, California, Cladis attended the University of California, Santa Barbara, where he earned his BA in religious studies. After receiving his doctorate from Princeton University, where he studied philosophy and social theory as they relate to the field of religious studies, he taught at Stanford University and Vassar College, where he served as chair for six years. Upon his arrival at Vassar, he began work in the environmental humanities; Native American and Indigenous Studies had been a longstanding interest throughout his trajectory. He arrived at Brown University in 2004 and has served as chair. He is an active faculty member in Native American and Indigenous Studies and a founding member of Environmental Humanities at Brown. He has won several awards and fellowships from such organizations as: the Carnegie Foundation, the Fulbright Senior Research Award Program, The Cogut Center for the Humanities, the Rockefeller Foundation, and the Franco-American Commission for Educational Exchange. He was a Fellow and visiting scholar at Oxford University as well as the Maison des Science de l'Homme and the Centre de Recherche en Epistémologie Appliquée, École Polytechnique.

== Life, education, and career ==
Mark Cladis was raised in Stanford, California. He attended the University of California, Santa Barbara, where he studied religion and philosophy after switching out of a physics and math major. After graduating from UCSB, he continued his education in a doctoral program at Princeton University. After studying for three years at Princeton, having completed his preliminary exams, he taught at the University of North Carolina, Greensboro for two years. Upon completing his doctorate from Princeton, Cladis taught at Stanford University with a joint appointment in Philosophy and Religious Studies, and then at Vassar College. He is now the Brooke Russell Astor Professor of Humanities at Brown University. He lives in Barrington, Rhode Island, with his wife and three children.

== Authorship ==
Radical Romanticism: Democracy, Religion, and the Environmental Imagination (Columbia University Press, 2025)

In Search of a Course (Pact Press, 2020)

Public Vision, Private Lives (Oxford University Press and Columbia University Press, 2007)

The Elementary Forms of Religious Life, editor (Oxford University Press, 2001)

Durkheim and Foucault: Perspectives on Education and Punishment, editor (Berghahn Books, 2001)

A Communitarian Defense of Liberalism (Stanford University Press, 1994)

Cladis has also authored over seventy-five articles, journals, and chapters in edited books. His publications have appeared in such journals, books, and fields of study as:

Philosophy of Religion/Religious Ethics:

- Journal of the American Academy of Religion
- Journal of Religious Ethics
- Religious Studies
- Religion
- Soundings: An Interdisciplinary Journal
- Religions
- International Journal of Philosophy and Theology
- Immanent Frame: Secularism, Religion, and the Public Sphere

Environmental Humanities:

- Interdisciplinary Studies in Literature and Environment
- European Journal of Literature, Culture and Environment
- Resistance: A Journal of Radical Environmental Humanities
- Cambridge Critical Concepts: Nature and Literary Studies (edited book)
- Worldviews: Global Religions, Culture, and Ecology
- Ecokritike
- Ecosustainable Narratives (edited book)
- Sustainability: Perspectives from the Humanities and Social Sciences (edited book)

Religion, Philosophy, and Literature:

- Philosophy and Literature
- Religion and Literature
- Journal of Religion and Literature
- Philosophical Readings

Political and Social Theory:

- Political Concepts
- The Good Society: The Journal of Political Economy of the Good Society
- History and Theory
- Philosophy and Social Criticism
- Interpretation
- Progressive Politics in the Global Age
- The Oxford Handbook of Emile Durkheim (edited book)
- British Journal of Sociology
- Journal of the History of the Behavioral Sciences
- Cambridge Companion to Durkheim (edited book)
- Journal of Moral Education
- Journal of the History of Ideas
- Suffering and Evil (edited book)

== Visiting research appointments ==
Cladis was a fellow at Wolfson College, Oxford; a visiting scholar at Oxford&#39;s Institute of Social and Cultural Anthropology; a visiting research fellow at Centre de Recherche en Epistémologie Appliquée, Ecole Polytechnique; and a scholar in residence at Maison Suger: Maison des Science de l’Homme.

== Awards ==
- Pembroke Faculty Fellow
- John Rowe Workman Award for Excellence in Teaching in the Humanities, Brown University
- Cogut Center for the Humanities: Faculty Fellowship
- National Endowments for the Humanities: Summer Fellowship
- Carnegie Scholar
- Rockefeller Foundation, Bellagio Study Center
- Interfoundational Grant from the Franco-American Commission for Educational Exchange, University of Strasbourg: Religion and Ethics Lecture Series
- Fulbright Senior Research Award
- National Endowments for the Humanities Summer Stipend
