= Velocity =

Speed and direction of a motion

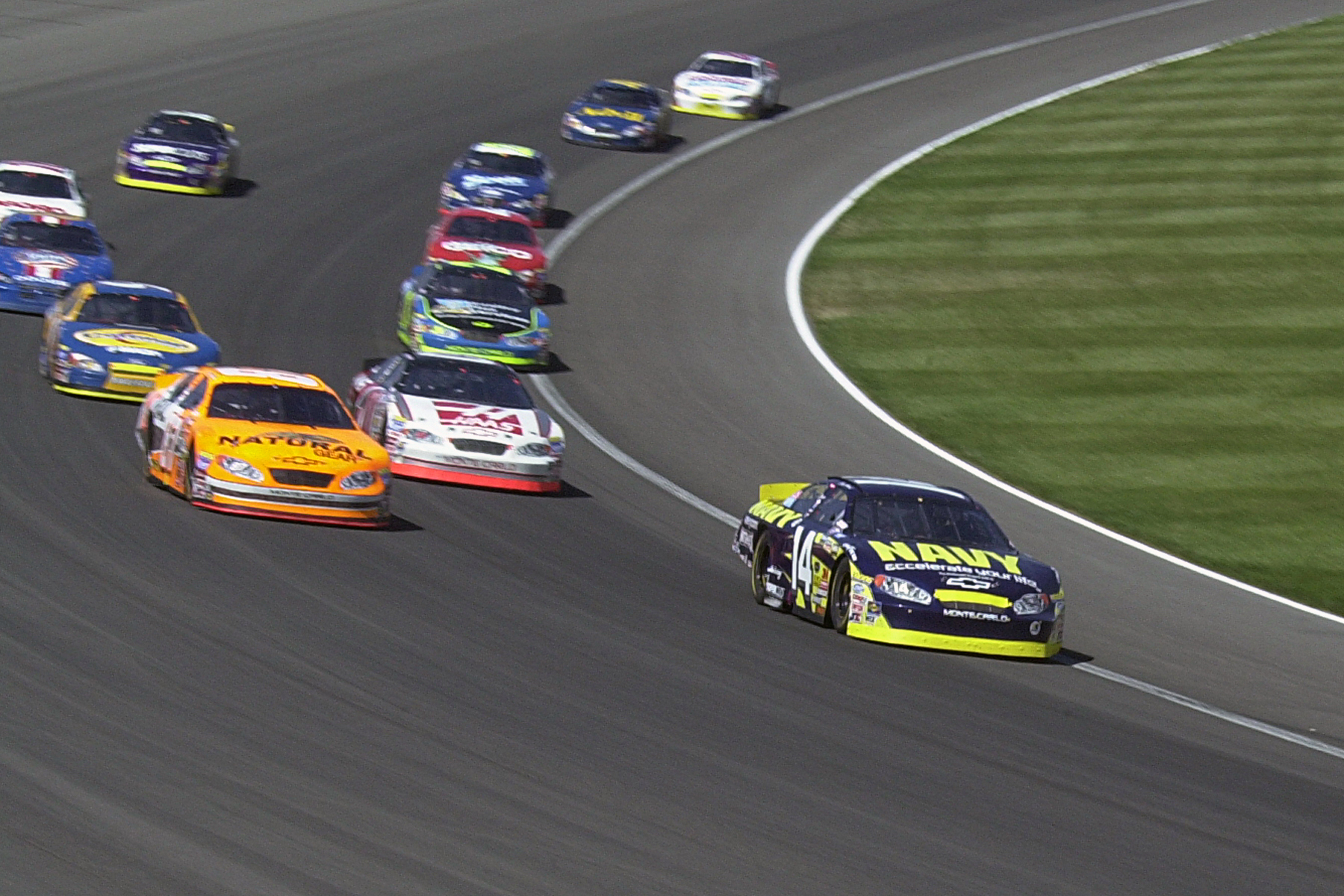
- As a change of direction occurs while the racing cars turn on the curved track, their velocity is not constant even if their speed is.
- Common symbols: v, v, v→, v
- Other units: kph, mph, ft/s
- In SI base units: m/s
- Dimension: L T^{−1}

Velocity is a measurement of speed in a certain direction of motion. It is a fundamental concept in kinematics, the branch of classical mechanics that describes the motion of physical objects. Velocity is a vector quantity, meaning that both magnitude and direction are needed to define it (velocity vector). The scalar absolute value (magnitude) of velocity is called speed, a quantity that is measured in metres per second (m/s or m⋅s^{−1}) in the SI (International System of Units) system. For example, "5 metres per second" is a scalar, whereas "5 metres per second east" is a vector. If there is a change in speed, direction or both, then the object is said to be undergoing an acceleration.

== Definition ==
=== Average velocity ===
The average velocity of an object over a period of time is its change in position, $\Delta s$, divided by the duration of the period, $\Delta t$, given mathematically as
$$\bar{v}=\frac{\Delta s}{\Delta t}.$$

=== Instantaneous velocity ===
Example of a velocity vs. time graph, and the relationship between velocity v on the y-axis, acceleration a (the three green tangent lines represent the values for acceleration at different points along the curve) and displacement s (the yellow area under the curve.)

The instantaneous velocity of an object is the limit average velocity as the time interval approaches zero. At any particular time t, it can be calculated as the derivative of the position with respect to time:
$$\boldsymbol{v} = \lim_{{\Delta t}\to 0} \frac{\Delta \boldsymbol{s}}{\Delta t} = \frac{d\boldsymbol{s}}{dt} .$$

From this derivative equation, in the one-dimensional case it can be seen that the area under a velocity vs. time (v vs. t graph) is the displacement, s. In calculus terms, the integral of the velocity function v(t) is the displacement function s(t). In the figure, this corresponds to the yellow area under the curve.
$$\boldsymbol{s} = \int \boldsymbol{v} \ dt .$$

Although the concept of an instantaneous velocity might at first seem counter-intuitive, it may be thought of as the velocity that the object would continue to travel at if it stopped accelerating at that moment.

=== Difference between speed and velocity ===
Kinematic quantities of a classical particle: mass m, position r, velocity v, acceleration a.

While the terms speed and velocity are often colloquially used interchangeably to connote how fast an object is moving, in scientific terms they are different. Speed, the scalar magnitude of a velocity vector, denotes only how fast an object is moving, while velocity indicates both an object's speed and direction.

To have a constant velocity, an object must have a constant speed in a constant direction. Constant direction constrains the object to motion in a straight path thus, a constant velocity means motion in a straight line at a constant speed.

For example, a car moving at a constant 20 kilometres per hour in a circular path has a constant speed, but does not have a constant velocity because its direction changes. Hence, the car is considered to be undergoing an acceleration.

=== Units ===
Since the derivative of the position with respect to time gives the change in position (in metres) divided by the change in time (in seconds), velocity is measured in metres per second (m/s).

== Equation of motion ==
=== Average velocity ===
Velocity is defined as the rate of change of position with respect to time, which may also be referred to as the instantaneous velocity to emphasize the distinction from the average velocity. In some applications the average velocity of an object might be needed, that is to say, the constant velocity that would provide the same resultant displacement as a variable velocity in the same time interval, v(t), over some time period Δt. Average velocity can be calculated as:
$$\mathbf{\bar{v}} = \frac{\Delta\mathbf{x}}{\Delta t} = \frac{\int_{t_0}^{t_1} \mathbf{v}(t)\, dt}{t_1-t_0}.$$

The average velocity is always less than or equal to the average speed of an object. This can be seen by realizing that while distance is always strictly increasing, displacement can increase or decrease in magnitude as well as change direction.

In terms of a displacement-time (x vs. t) graph, the instantaneous velocity (or, simply, velocity) can be thought of as the slope of the tangent line to the curve at any point, and the average velocity as the slope of the secant line between two points with t coordinates equal to the boundaries of the time period for the average velocity.

==== Special cases ====
- When a particle moves with different uniform speeds v_{1}, v_{2}, v_{3}, ..., v_{n} in different time intervals t_{1}, t_{2}, t_{3}, ..., t_{n} respectively, then average speed over the total time of journey is given as
  $$\bar{v} = \frac{v_1 t_1+ v_2 t_2+ v_3 t_3+ \dots+ v_n t_n}{ t_1+ t_2+ t_3+ \dots + t_n}$$
  If t_{1} = t_{2} = t_{3} = ... = t, then average speed is given by the arithmetic mean of the speeds
  $$\bar{v} = \frac{v_1+v_2+v_3+\dots+v_n}{n} = \frac{1}{n}\sum_{i=1}^n{v_i}$$
- When a particle moves different distances s_{1}, s_{2}, s_{3},..., s_{n} with speeds v_{1}, v_{2}, v_{3},..., v_{n} respectively, then the average speed of the particle over the total distance is given as
  $$\bar{v} ={s_1+s_2+s_3+\dots+s_n\over t_1+t_2+t_3+\dots+t_n}={{s_1+s_2+s_3+\dots+s_n}\over {{s_1\over v_1}+{s_2\over v_2}+ {s_3\over v_3}+\dots+{s_n\over v_n}}}$$
  If s_{1} = s_{2} = s_{3} = ... = s, then average speed is given by the harmonic mean of the speeds
  $$\bar{v} = n\left({1\over v_1} + {1\over v_2} + {1\over v_3} + \dots + {1\over v_n}\right)^{-1} =n\left(\sum_{i=1}^n\frac{1}{v_i}\right)^{-1}.$$

=== Relationship to acceleration ===
Although velocity is defined as the rate of change of position, it is often common to start with an expression for an object's acceleration. As seen by the three green tangent lines in the figure, an object's instantaneous acceleration at a point in time is the slope of the line tangent to the curve of a v(t) graph at that point. In other words, instantaneous acceleration is defined as the derivative of velocity with respect to time:
$$\boldsymbol{a} = \frac{d\boldsymbol{v}}{dt} .$$

From there, velocity is expressed as the area under an a(t) acceleration vs. time graph. As above, this is done using the concept of the integral:

$$\boldsymbol{v} = \int \boldsymbol{a} \ dt .$$

==== Constant acceleration ====
In the special case of constant acceleration, velocity can be studied using the suvat equations. By considering a as being equal to some arbitrary constant vector, this shows
$$\boldsymbol{v} = \boldsymbol{u} + \boldsymbol{a}t$$
with v as the velocity at time t and u as the velocity at time t = 0. By combining this equation with the suvat equation x = ut + at^{2}/2, it is possible to relate the displacement and the average velocity by
$$\boldsymbol{x} = \frac{(\boldsymbol{u} + \boldsymbol{v})}{2} t = \boldsymbol{\bar{v}}t.$$
It is also possible to derive an expression for the velocity independent of time, known as the Torricelli equation, as follows:
$$\begin{align}
v^2 = \boldsymbol{v}\cdot\boldsymbol{v}
&= (\boldsymbol{u}+\boldsymbol{a}t) \cdot (\boldsymbol{u}+\boldsymbol{a}t) \\
&= u^{2} + 2t(\boldsymbol{a}\cdot\boldsymbol{u})+a^{2}t^{2}
\end{align}$$
$$\begin{align}
(2\boldsymbol{a})\cdot\boldsymbol{x} &= (2\boldsymbol{a}) \cdot \left(\boldsymbol{u}t + \tfrac{1}{2} \boldsymbol{a} t^2\right) \\[1ex]
&= 2t (\boldsymbol{a} \cdot \boldsymbol{u}) + a^2 t^2 = v^{2} - u^{2}
\end{align}$$
$$\therefore v^2 = u^2 + 2(\boldsymbol{a}\cdot\boldsymbol{x})$$
where v = |v| etc.

The above equations are valid for both Newtonian mechanics and special relativity. Where Newtonian mechanics and special relativity differ is in how different observers would describe the same situation. In particular, in Newtonian mechanics, all observers agree on the value of t and the transformation rules for position create a situation in which all non-accelerating observers would describe the acceleration of an object with the same values. Neither is true for special relativity. In other words, only relative velocity can be calculated.

== Quantities that are dependent on velocity ==
=== Momentum ===
In classical mechanics, Newton's second law defines momentum, p, as a vector that is the product of an object's mass and velocity, given mathematically as
$$\boldsymbol{p} = m\boldsymbol{v}$$
where m is the mass of the object.

=== Kinetic energy ===
The kinetic energy of a moving object is dependent on its velocity and is given by the equation
$$E_{\text{k}} = \tfrac{1}{2} m v^2$$
where E_{k} is the kinetic energy. Kinetic energy is a scalar quantity as it depends on the square of the velocity.

=== Drag (fluid resistance) ===
In fluid dynamics, drag is a force acting opposite to the relative motion of any object moving with respect to a surrounding fluid. The drag force, $F_D$, is dependent on the square of velocity and is given as
$$F_D\, =\, \tfrac12\, \rho\, v^2\, C_D\, A$$
where

- $\rho$ is the density of the fluid,
- $v$ is the speed of the object relative to the fluid,
- $A$ is the cross sectional area, and
- $C_D$ is the drag coefficient – a dimensionless number.

=== Escape velocity ===
Escape velocity is the minimum speed a ballistic object needs to escape from a massive body such as Earth. It represents the kinetic energy that, when added to the object's gravitational potential energy (which is always negative), is equal to zero. The general formula for the escape velocity of an object at a distance r from the center of a planet with mass M is
$$v_{\text{e}} = \sqrt{\frac{2GM}{r}} = \sqrt{2gr},$$
where G is the gravitational constant and g is the gravitational acceleration. The escape velocity from Earth's surface is about 11 200 m/s, and is irrespective of the direction of the object. This makes "escape velocity" somewhat of a misnomer, as the more correct term would be "escape speed": any object attaining a velocity of that magnitude, irrespective of atmosphere, will leave the vicinity of the base body as long as it does not intersect with something in its path.

=== The Lorentz factor of special relativity ===
In special relativity, the dimensionless Lorentz factor appears frequently, and is given by
$$\gamma = \frac{1}{\sqrt{1-\frac{v^2}{c^2}}}$$
where γ is the Lorentz factor and c is the speed of light.

== Relative velocity ==
Relative velocity is a measurement of velocity between two objects as determined in a single coordinate system. Relative velocity is fundamental in both classical and modern physics, since many systems in physics deal with the relative motion of two or more particles.

Consider an object A moving with velocity vector v and an object B with velocity vector w; these absolute velocities are typically expressed in the same inertial reference frame. Then, the velocity of object A relative to object B is defined as the difference of the two velocity vectors:
$$\boldsymbol{v}_{A\text{ relative to }B} = \boldsymbol{v} - \boldsymbol{w}$$
Similarly, the relative velocity of object B moving with velocity w, relative to object A moving with velocity v is:
$$\boldsymbol{v}_{B\text{ relative to }A} = \boldsymbol{w} - \boldsymbol{v}$$
Usually, the inertial frame chosen is that in which the latter of the two mentioned objects is in rest.

In Newtonian mechanics, the relative velocity is independent of the chosen inertial reference frame. This is not the case anymore with special relativity in which velocities depend on the choice of reference frame.

=== Scalar velocities ===
In the one-dimensional case, the velocities are scalars and the equation is either:
$$v_\text{rel} = v - (-w),$$
if the two objects are moving in opposite directions, or:
$$v_\text{rel} = v -(+w),$$
if the two objects are moving in the same direction.

== Coordinate systems ==
=== Cartesian coordinates ===
In multi-dimensional Cartesian coordinate systems, velocity is broken up into components that correspond with each dimensional axis of the coordinate system. In a two-dimensional system, where there is an x-axis and a y-axis, corresponding velocity components are defined as

$$v_x=dx/dt,$$

$$v_y=dy/dt.$$

The two-dimensional velocity vector is then defined as $\textbf{v}=\langle v_x, v_y\rangle$. The magnitude of this vector represents speed and is found by the distance formula as

$$|\mathbf{v}|=\sqrt{v_x^2+v_y^2}.$$

In three-dimensional systems where there is an additional z-axis, the corresponding velocity component is defined as

$$v_z=dz/dt.$$

The three-dimensional velocity vector is defined as $\textbf{v}=\langle v_x, v_y, v_z\rangle$ with its magnitude also representing speed and being determined by

$$|\mathbf{v}|=\sqrt{v_x^2+v_y^2+v_z^2}.$$

While some textbooks use subscript notation to define Cartesian components of velocity, others use $u$, $v$, and $w$ for the $x$-, $y$-, and $z$-axes respectively.

=== Polar coordinates ===
Representation of radial and tangential components of velocity at different moments of linear motion with constant velocity of the object around an observer O (it corresponds, for example, to the passage of a car on a straight street around a pedestrian standing on the sidewalk). The radial component can be observed due to the Doppler effect, the tangential component causes visible changes of the position of the object.

In polar coordinates, a two-dimensional velocity is described by a radial velocity, defined as the component of velocity away from or toward the origin, and a transverse velocity, perpendicular to the radial one. Both arise from angular velocity, which is the rate of rotation about the origin (with positive quantities representing counter-clockwise rotation and negative quantities representing clockwise rotation, in a right-handed coordinate system).

The radial and traverse velocities can be derived from the Cartesian velocity and displacement vectors by decomposing the velocity vector into radial and transverse components. The transverse velocity is the component of velocity along a circle centered at the origin.
$$\boldsymbol{v}=\boldsymbol{v}_T+\boldsymbol{v}_R$$
where

- $\boldsymbol{v}_T$ is the transverse velocity
- $\boldsymbol{v}_R$ is the radial velocity.

The radial speed (or magnitude of the radial velocity) is the dot product of the velocity vector and the unit vector in the radial direction.
$$v_R = \frac{\boldsymbol{v} \cdot \boldsymbol{r}}{\left|\boldsymbol{r}\right|} = \boldsymbol{v} \cdot \hat{\boldsymbol{r}}$$
where $\boldsymbol{r}$ is position and $\hat{\boldsymbol{r}}$ is the radial direction.

The transverse speed (or magnitude of the transverse velocity) is the magnitude of the cross product of the unit vector in the radial direction and the velocity vector. It is also the dot product of velocity and transverse direction, or the product of the angular speed $\omega$ and the radius (the magnitude of the position).
$$v_T=\frac{|\boldsymbol{r}\times\boldsymbol{v}|}{|\boldsymbol{r}|}= \boldsymbol{v} \cdot \hat{\boldsymbol{t}}=\omega|\boldsymbol{r}|$$
such that
$$\omega=\frac{|\boldsymbol{r}\times\boldsymbol{v}|}{|\boldsymbol{r}|^2}.$$

Angular momentum in scalar form is the mass times the distance to the origin times the transverse velocity, or equivalently, the mass times the distance squared times the angular speed. The sign convention for angular momentum is the same as that for angular velocity.
$$L = mrv_T = mr^2\omega$$
where

- $m$ is mass
- $r=|\boldsymbol{r}|.$

The expression $mr^2$ is known as moment of inertia. If forces are in the radial direction only with an inverse square dependence, as in the case of a gravitational orbit, angular momentum is constant, and transverse speed is inversely proportional to the distance, angular speed is inversely proportional to the distance squared, and the rate at which area is swept out is constant. These relations are known as Kepler's laws of planetary motion.

== See also ==
- Four-velocity (relativistic version of velocity for Minkowski spacetime)
- Group velocity
- Hypervelocity
- Phase velocity
- Proper velocity (in relativity, using traveler time instead of observer time)
- Rapidity (a version of velocity additive at relativistic speeds)
- Terminal velocity
- Velocity field
- Velocity vs. time graph

== Notes ==
- Robert Resnick and Jearl Walker, Fundamentals of Physics, Wiley; 7 Sub edition (June 16, 2004). ISBN 0-471-23231-9.

Linear/translational quantities				Angular/rotational quantities			
Dimensions	1	L	L^{2}	Dimensions	1	θ	θ^{2}
T	time: t s	absement: A m s		T	time: t s		
1		distance: d, position: r, s, x, displacement m	area: A m^{2}	1		angle: θ, angular displacement: θ rad	solid angle: Ω rad^{2}, sr
T^{−1}	frequency: f s^{−1}, Hz	speed: v, velocity: v m s^{−1}	kinematic viscosity: ν, specific angular momentum: h m^{2} s^{−1}	T^{−1}	frequency: f, rotational speed: n, rotational velocity: n s^{−1}, Hz	angular speed: ω, angular velocity: ω rad s^{−1}	
T^{−2}		acceleration: a m s^{−2}		T^{−2}	rotational acceleration s^{−2}	angular acceleration: α rad s^{−2}	
T^{−3}		jerk: j m s^{−3}		T^{−3}		angular jerk: ζ rad s^{−3}	
M	mass: m kg	weighted position: M ⟨x⟩ = ∑ m x	moment of inertia: I kg m^{2}	ML			
MT^{−1}	Mass flow rate: $\dot{m}$ kg s^{−1}	momentum: p, impulse: J kg m s^{−1}, N s	action: 𝒮, actergy: ℵ kg m^{2} s^{−1}, J s	MLT^{−1}		angular momentum: L, angular impulse: ΔL kg m rad s^{−1}	
MT^{−2}		force: F, weight: F_{g} kg m s^{−2}, N	energy: E, work: W, Lagrangian: L kg m^{2} s^{−2}, J	MLT^{−2}		torque: τ, moment: M kg m rad s^{−2}, N m	
MT^{−3}		yank: Y kg m s^{−3}, N s^{−1}	power: P kg m^{2} s^{−3}, W	MLT^{−3}		rotatum: P kg m rad s^{−3}, N m s^{−1}	
