= Centre de Recherche en Epistémologie Appliquée =

French research centre

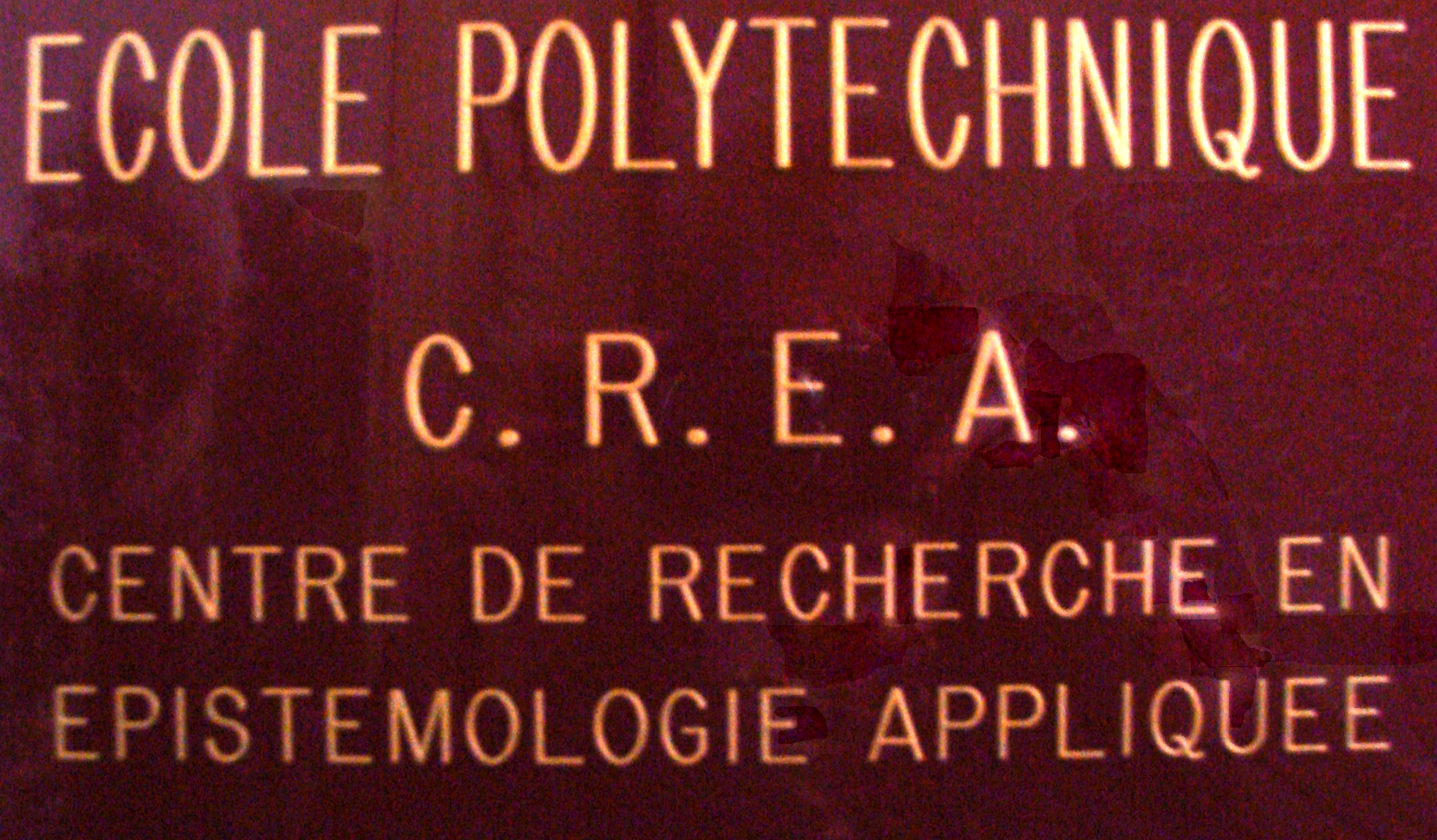

The Centre de Recherche en Épistémologie Appliquée (CRÉA, Paris) — the Center for Research in Applied Epistemology — conducts research in humanities and the social sciences. It was founded in 1982 as a center for cognitive science and epistemology as part of the École Polytechnique in Paris.

From the beginning it focused on two areas:

1. modeling the self-organization of complex systems related to cognition, economics and social phenomena, and
2. the philosophy of science, in particular the epistemology of cognitive science.

Over 20 researchers, as well as post-doctoral fellows, Ph.D. students, and visiting scholars work on interdisciplinary topics related to cognitive science, including cognitive neuroscience and cognitive economics, cognitive linguistics, epistemology, phenomenology, and on mathematical models related to dynamic systems theory, control theory, and logic. They explore both theoretical and empirical perspectives.

The CREA lab was shut in December 2011.

== People ==
Researchers based at CREA include: Mark ANSPACH, Jean-Pierre Aubin, Jean-Michel BESNIER, Michel Bitbol, Paul BOURGINE, Gabriel CATREN, David CHAVALARIAS, Eva CRÜCK, René DOURSAT, Jean-Paul DOUTHE, Jean-Pierre Dupuy, Serge Galam, Pierre KERSZBERG, Jean LASSÈGUE , Dorothée LEGRAND, Giuseppe LONGO, Bernard PACHOUD, Jean PETITOT, David PIOTROWSKI, Olivier REY, Alessandro SARTI, Lucien SCUBLA, Richard TOPOL, Francisco Varela, Yves-Marie VISETTI .
