= Serge Galam =

French physicist (born 1952)

Serge Galam (born 1952) is a French physicist and Scientist Emeritus at CNRS.

== Biography ==
In 1975, Serge Galam obtained a PhD in physics at the Pierre and Marie Curie University in Paris. In 1981, he received a Ph.D. in physics at Tel Aviv University. From 1981 to 1983, he taught at City University of New York and from 1983 to 1985 at New York University.

From 1984 to 2004, he worked in several physics laboratories of the Pierre and Marie Curie University.

In 1999, he was appointed director of research at the Centre national de la recherche scientifique.

In 2004 he joined the Center for Research in Applied Epistemology of the École Polytechnique (CREA). In 2013, he joined the faculty of Sciences Po.

Serge Galam is one of the pioneers of the modern field of sociophysics. His work focuses on the dynamics of group decision making and how minority opinions can sway public opinion. In the fall of 2016, using the principles of sociophysics, Galam predicted the election of Donald Trump, although he would incorrectly predict Trump's reelection in the fall of 2020.

== See also ==
- Nassim Nicholas Taleb
- Dominant minority

== Sources ==
- Galam, Serge (2012). Sociophysics: A Physicist's Modeling of Psycho-political Phenomena. New York: Springer-Verlag. ISBN 978-1-4614-2031-6.
