= Domestic tariff area =

Area within India outside of a special economic zone

Domestic Tariff Area (DTA) or Domestic Tariff Zone (DTZ) are areas within India that are outside the Special Economic Zones and EOU/EHTP/STP/BTP.

The units operating under certain specific schemes such as EPZ/SEZ/EOU are expected to carry out their activities within a customs bonded area. Any area which is not under the jurisdiction of a custom bonded area is called a Domestic Tariff Area.

== Procedure for the procurement from the domestic tariff area ==
Supplies from the DTA to a SEZ unit or developer without payment of central excise duty shall be on the cover of ARE-1, as is the case for normal exports out of India, i.e. under a surety or undertaking executed by the DTA supplier with the jurisdictional central excise officer.

A bill of export needs to be filed by the DTA supplier or the unit/developer on behalf of DTA to the authorised officer for assessment before the arrival of goods.

If the goods arrive before the bill of export is filed, they shall be kept in a place meant for keeping such goods and shall be released only after the assessment of the bill of export.

A copy of ARE-1 and the bill of export need to be forwarded to the central excise officer having jurisdiction over the DTA within 45 days.

The developer or unit can claim drawback or a duty entitlement pass book if the bill of export has been filed under it and if the unit or developer does not intend to claim, a disclaimer to this effect shall be given to the DTA supplier for claiming such benefits, provided the Duty Entitlement Pass Book DEPB scheme may be claimed by the DTA supplier.

The unit or developer may procure goods from the DTA without availing himself of exemptions, drawbacks and concessions on the basis of an invoice or transport document issued by the supplier.

A SEZ unit or developer may also procure:

- Goods from international exhibitions held in India
- Goods or services without payment of duty from an EOU/STP/BTP.
- Goods or services from another unit located in the same or any other SEZ.

== Use of goods procured from DTA Unit ==
The goods declared into a SEZ shall be used by the Unit or the Developer only for carrying out the authorised operations.

The goods can be used for purposes other than for the authorised operations or if the Unit or Developer fails to account for the goods as provided under these rules, duty shall be chargeable on such goods as if these goods have been cleared for home consumption.

If the unit is unable to use the goods imported or procured from the Domestic Tariff Area, it may export the goods or sell the same to another Unit or to an Export-oriented industrialisation Unit or Electronics Technology Park Unit or Software Technology Park Unit or Biotechnology Park Unit, without payment of duty, or dispose of the same in the Domestic Tariff Area on payment of applicable duties on the basis of an import licence submitted by the Domestic Tariff Area buyer

All documents for acceptance of goods into and out of a SEZ should be filed before the Authorised Officer of Customs.

== Sales in Domestic Tariff Area ==
A Unit can sell goods and services including rejects or wastes or scraps or remnants or broken diamonds or by-products arising during the manufacturing process or in connection therewith, in the Domestic Tariff Area on payment of Customs duties or Excise Duties, as the case may be.

== Procedure for sale in Domestic Tariff Area ==
A SEZ Unit on behalf of Domestic Tariff Area buyer shall file a Bill of Entry for home consumption giving a complete description of the goods and/or services, along with an invoice and packing list with the Authorised Officers.

== Domestic Tariff Area removals ==
A Unit may remove capital goods to Domestic Tariff Area after use in a SEZ on payment of duty.

Goods supplied by a Unit to Domestic Tariff Area on payment of duty may be brought back to the Unit for the purpose of repair within a period of six months from the date of clearance.

== Temporary removals to Domestic Tariff Area ==
The Unit may temporarily remove the following goods to a Domestic Tariff Area without payment of duty:

- Capital goods and parts thereof for repairs and return;
- Goods for display, export promotion, exhibition;
- Goods for job work, test, repair, refining and calibration;
- Laptop or notebook computers or video projection systems for use by authorised employees of a Unit or developer;
- Any other goods with the prior approval of the Authorised Officer.

== Domestic Tariff Area – news results ==
- Exporters in domestic tariff area seek taxation parity
- SEZ developers want CST removed on domestic sale
- Domestic tariff area sales to EOU
