= Mictomagnetism =

Mictomagnetism is a spin system in which various exchange interactions are mixed. It is observed in several kinds of alloys, including Cu–Mn, Fe–Al and Ni–Mn alloys. Cooled in zero magnetic field, these materials have low remanence and coercivity. Cooled in a magnetic field, they have much larger remanence, and the hysteresis loop is shifted in the direction opposite to the field (an effect similar to exchange bias).
