= Morphology-dependent resonance =

Resonance based on morphology

Resonances found in certain types of optical cavity that are cylindrical, spherical, and ellipsoidal in shape. Conditions under which the resonances occur dependent on shape as well as refractive index of material within the optical cavity, and normally characterized by two integers, namely, order number and mode number.
