= Magnetohydrodynamics (journal) =

- Discipline: Magnetohydrodynamics
- Language: English
- Edited by: Andrejs Cēbers

Publication details
- Former names: Magnitnaya Gidrodinamika; ISSN 0025-0015
- History: 1965–present
- Publisher: Institute of Physics, University of Latvia (Latvia)
- Frequency: Quarterly
- Impact factor: 0.588 (2015)

Standard abbreviations
- ISO 4: Magnetohydrodynamics

Indexing
- ISSN: 0024-998X
- OCLC no.: 52651490

Links
- Journal homepage; Online access

Magnetohydrodynamics is a peer-reviewed physics journal published by the Institute of Physics of the University of Latvia, covering fundamental and applied problems of magnetohydrodynamics in incompressible media, including magnetic fluids. This involves both classical and emerging areas in the physics, thermodynamics, hydrodynamics, and electrodynamics of magnetic fluids. As of 2010, the editor-in-chief is Andrejs Cēbers of the Institute of Physics of the University of Latvia. Since 2001 the journal has been published solely in English.

The English and online edition were published by Kluwer Academic Publishers (now part of Springer-Verlag) through volume 36, number 4 (2001). Now the entire content is available by subscription directly from the journal's website.

== Abstracting and indexing ==
The journal is abstracted and indexed in the Science Citation Index Expanded, as well as the Journal Citation Reports, and Inspec.
