= Matthew Koss =

American physicist

Matthew B. Koss (born September 16, 1961, in Boston, Massachusetts) is a widely published solid-state physicist.

== Biography ==
Koss received his A.B. degree from Vassar College in 1983 and a Ph.D. in experimental condensed matter physics from Tufts University in 1989.

From 1990 to 2000, Koss worked at Rensselaer Polytechnic Institute as Lead Scientist for the Isothermal Dendritic Growth Experiment (IDGE), a basic microgravity research project on dendritic solidification that conducted Space Shuttle flight experiments on STS-62, -75 and -87. He also worked as the principal investigator of the Transient Dendritic Solidification Experiment (TDSE), a flight experiment intended for use on the International Space Station in 2006.

In June 2003, Koss created controversy via an editorial published in The New York Times, in which he wrote that scientists bore partial responsibility for the Space Shuttle Columbia disaster. He argued that most microgravity scientific experiments did not require crewed space missions, but were used to promote the space program. The article drew widespread attention, and Koss later appeared at a congressional hearing before the House Science Committee.

In 2000, Koss started working at College of the Holy Cross in Worcester, Massachusetts, where he continued his isothermal dendritic growth research. As of April 2008, Koss was an associate professor of physics at Holy Cross. He remains listed as a professor in the Holy Cross physics department as of April 2022.

In 2005, Koss began research on the physics of baseball. He collected data on a baseball in flight to create his own Reynolds number vs. drag coefficient plot, to compare against other models. He also created a hybrid model of the flight path that a baseball will take, given all of the initial conditions. He also worked to add other factors that would affect the flight, such as the spin decay rate of a baseball in flight.
