= Miloslav Valouch =

Czech physicist and mathematician

Miloslav Valouch (4 August 1878 in Lazce – 13 March 1952 in Prague) was a Czechoslovak physicist and mathematician.
