= Myron Samuel Malkin =

American administrator and physicist

Myron Samuel Malkin (1924 - 1994) was a U.S. administrator and physicist. Malkin was the father and first director of the U.S. Space Shuttle program from 1973 to 1980.

Malkin was born in Youngstown, Ohio. He served in the United States Marine Corp during World War II. He was involved with the US takeover of Iow Jima. He studied at Yale University eventually earning his Ph.D. there in nuclear physics.

== Sources ==
- New York Times obityuary for Malkin
