= Export Promotion Council =

Export Promotion Council of Kenya
- Abbreviation: EPC
- Formation: August 19, 1992
- Type: Government agency
- Legal status: Public institution
- Purpose: Export development and promotion
- Headquarters: Nairobi, Kenya
- Region served: Kenya
- Official language: English
- Main organ: Sectoral Panels
- Affiliations: Center for Business Information in Kenya (CBIK); Fresh Produce Export Association of Kenya (FPEAK); Kenya Flower Council
- Website: Export Promotion Council official site

The Export Promotion Council of Kenya (EPC) is Kenya's premier institution in the development and promotion of export trade in the country. Established in 1992, EPC's primary objective was to address bottlenecks that were facing exporters and producers of export goods and services with a view to increasing the performance of the export sector. The Council was therefore established for the purpose of giving an outward orientation to an economy that was hitherto inward looking. Over time, the EPC has embraced the mandate of co-ordinating and harmonising export development and promotion activities in the country, providing leadership to all national export programmes. Today, EPC is the focal point for export development and promotion activities in the country.

The EPC was established on August 19, 1992 through Legal Notice No. 4342, with the mandate of developing and promoting Kenya's exports. In pursuit of its mandate, the EPC primary objective is to address bottlenecks facing exporters and producers of export goods and services in order to increase the performance level of the export sector. It also provides a forum for dialogue between the exporting fraternity and relevant public and private sector institutions and organizations through Sectoral Panels.

== Sectors ==
The EPC is organized by industrial sector:

- Horticulture and other Agriculturals
- Textiles and Clothing
- Commercial Crafts and SMEs (Small and Medium Size Enterprises)
- Fish and Livestock products
- Other manufactures
- Services other than tourism

== Associated organizations ==
- Center for Business Information in Kenya (CBIK)
- Fresh Produce Export Association of Kenya (FPEAK)
- Kenya Flower Council
