= Michel Bitbol =

French researcher

Michel Bitbol (born 12 March 1954) is a French researcher in philosophy of science.

He is "Directeur de recherche" at CNRS, previously in the Centre de Recherche en Épistémologie Appliquée (CREA) of École polytechnique (Paris, France). He is now a member of Archives Husserl, École Normale Superieure (Paris, France).

== Career ==
His research interests are mainly focused on the influence of quantum physics on philosophy. He first worked on Erwin Schrödinger's metaphysics and philosophy of physics.

Using theorems demonstrated by Jean-Louis Destouches, Paulette Destouches-Février, and R.I.G. Hughes, he pointed out that the structure of quantum mechanics may be derived to a large extent from the assumption that microscopic phenomena cannot be dissociated from their experimental context. His views on quantum mechanics converge with ideas developed by Julian Schwinger and Asher Peres, according to whom quantum mechanics is a "symbolism of atomic measurements", rather than a description of atomic objects. He also defends ideas close to Anton Zeilinger's, by claiming that quantum laws do not express the nature of physical objects, but only the bounds of experimental information. More recently, he has written in support of QBism, arguing that it parallels some ideas in phenomenology.

Along with this view, quantum mechanics is no longer considered as a physical theory in the ordinary sense, but rather as a background framework for physical theories, since it goes back to the most elementary conditions which allow us to formulate any physical theory whatsoever. Some reviewers suggested half-seriously to call this view of physics "Kantum physics". Indeed, Michel Bitbol often refers to the philosophy of I. Kant, according to whom one can understand the contents of knowledge only by analyzing the (sensorial, instrumental, and rational) conditions of possibility of such knowledge.

He was granted an award by the French "Académie des sciences morales et politiques" in 1997, for his work in the philosophy of quantum mechanics.

Later on, he concentrated on the philosophy of mind and consciousness, defending a strongly anti-reductionist and neo-Wittgensteinian view. He collaborated with Francisco Varela on this subject.

He has written a systematic criticism of one of the original versions of speculative realism, formulated by Quentin Meillassoux. The title of his book published in 2019 ("Maintenant la finitude") is a direct reply to Meillassoux's "After Finitude".

He participated in the 2002/2013 conferences of the Mind and Life Institute, whose aim is to promote a dialogue between science and Buddhism. He subsequently wrote a book developing a thoroughly relational reading of quantum mechanics, with due reference to the Buddhist concept of dependent arising.

== Bibliography ==
- Mécanique quantique, une introduction philosophique, Champs-Flammarion, 1997.
- L'aveuglante proximité du réel, Champs-Flammarion, 1998.
- Physique et Philosophie de l'Esprit, Champs-Flammarion, 2005.
- Schrödinger's Philosophy of Quantum Mechanics, Kluwer, 1996.
- De l'Intérieur du monde. Pour une philosophie et une science des relations, Flammarion, 2010.
- La conscience a-t-elle une origine?, Flammarion, 2014.
- La pratique des possibles, une lecture pragmatiste et modale de la mécanique quantique, Hermann, 2015.
- Maintenant la finitude. Peut-on penser l'absolu?, Flammarion, 2019.
- Philosophie quantique. Le monde est-il extérieur?, Éditions Mimésis, 2023.

Translations

- French translation of Schrödinger's Mind and Matter (with an extensive introduction), Seuil, 1990.
- French translation (with Annie Bitbol-Hespériès) of Schrödinger's: Nature and the Greeks (with an extensive introduction), Seuil, 1992.
