= Material dispersion coefficient =

In an optical fiber, the material dispersion coefficient, M(λ), characterizes the amount of pulse broadening by material dispersion per unit length of fiber and per unit of spectral width. It is usually expressed in picoseconds per (nanometre·kilometre).

For many optical fiber materials, M(λ) approaches zero at a specific wavelength λ_{0} between 1.3 and 1.5 μm. At wavelengths shorter than λ_{0}, M(λ) is negative and increases with wavelength; at wavelengths longer than λ_{0}, M(λ) is positive and decreases with wavelength.

Pulse broadening caused by material dispersion in a unit length of optical fiber is given by the product of M(λ) and spectral width (Δλ).
