= Masatsugu Suzuki =

Japanese physicist

Masatsugu Sei Suzuki
- Born: Japan
- Education: Yokohama National University, and University of Tokyo
- Scientific career
- Fields: Physics
- Workplaces: Binghamton University
- Doctoral advisor: Sei-ichi Tanuma

Masatsugu Sei Suzuki is a Japanese-American physicist. He is a professor of physics and is affiliated with the Institute for Materials Research at Binghamton University. He has published 155 scientific papers in peer-reviewed journals.

== Education and career ==
Dr. Suzuki received his B.S. and M.S. degrees in electrical engineering from Yokohama National University in 1971 and 1973, respectively. He received his Ph.D. in physics from the University of Tokyo.

After completing his Ph.D., Suzuki was a research associate with the Department of Physics at Ochanomizu University in Tokyo, Japan until 1984.Suzuki has been doing research on the magnetic properties of magnetic ternary GIC’s such as random-mixture GIC’s (RMGIC’s) and graphite bi-intercalation compounds (GBIC’s) at Binghamton University’s Department of Physics since 1986.

Prior to joining the physics department at Binghamton, he spent a year as a visiting scientist with the Department of Physics at the University of Illinois at Urbana-Champaign followed by a year as a visiting scientist with Schlumberger-Doll Research in Ridgefield, Connecticut.

== Research ==
Suzuki primarily investigates the structural and magnetic properties of various graphite intercalation compounds.

== Other interests ==
In his spare time, Suzuki enjoys traveling with his family. He works along with his wife, Professor Itsuko Suzuki, in adjacent offices at Binghamton University. They frequently take walks together around campus.

== Book ==
- Toshiaki Enoki; Masatsugu Suzuki & Morinobu Endo (2003). Graphite Intercalation Compounds and Applications. Oxford University Press. ISBN 0-19-512827-3.

== Most cited papers ==
Suzuki has published over 100 scientific papers. The following is a short list of some of his most cited papers.

- Suzuki M, Masatsugu (1990). "Magnetic-Properties of Stage 2 CoCl2-Graphite Intercalation Compound". Critical Reviews in Solid State and Material Sciences. 16 (4): 237–254. Bibcode:1990CRSSM..16..237S. doi:10.1080/10408439008243749.
- Suzuki M, Lee C, Suzuki IS, Matsubara K, Sugihara K (1996). "c-axis resistivity of MoCl5 graphite intercalation compounds". Physical Review B. 54 (23): 17128–17140. Bibcode:1996PhRvB..5417128S. doi:10.1103/PhysRevB.54.17128. PMID 9985848.
- Song YN, Zavalij PY, Suzuki M, Whittingham MS (2002). "New iron(III) phosphate phases: Crystal structure and electrochemical and magnetic properties". Inorganic Chemistry. 41 (22): 5778–5786. doi:10.1021/ic025688q. PMID 12401083.
- Suzuki M, Suzuki IS, Burr CR, Wiesler DG, Rosov N, Koga K (1994). "Structural and magnetic properties of CuCl2 graphite intercalation compounds". Physical Review B. 50 (13): 9188–9199. Bibcode:1994PhRvB..50.9188S. doi:10.1103/PhysRevB.50.9188. PMID 9974964.
- Suzuki IS, Suzuki M, Tien LF, Burr CR, Itsuko; Suzuki, Masatsugu; Tien, Li-Fen; Burr, Charles (1991). "Structural and magnetic properties of stage-2 CocMn1-cCl2-graphite intercalation compounds". Physical Review B. 43 (8): 6393–6404. Bibcode:1991PhRvB..43.6393S. doi:10.1103/PhysRevB.43.6393. PMID 9998077.
