= Museum of Optical Technologies =

Museum in Saint Petersburg, Russia

Coordinates: 59.944478°N 30.295132°E

The Museum of Optical Technologies functions as part of the St. Petersburg State University of Information Technologies, Mechanics and Optics (SPbSU ITMO). It was founded to acquaint young people with the achievements in optical technology, including both modern optical engineering and information technology.

== Overview ==
The museum is located at 14th Birzhevaya Line and was opened on December 16, 2003, at Vasilevsky Island as an open and interactive optics museum. It was formerly known as the Laboratories of the Russian State Optical Institute with support of the Saint Petersburg City Administration.

During 2009-2010, it planned to open an interactive hall for employment of Schoolchildren.

== Exhibitions ==
The exposition is located on the ground floor of the building and consists of 3 halls.

- The first hall, there is a collection of art and computer holograms, real holographic installations, a statue of Yuri Nikolaevich Denisyuk, and a training display - "a holography Basis" .
- The second hall, there is a large antique collection of bronze mirrors, old fixtures, gnomon samples, astrolabes, armillary spheres, reading stones, displays about the nature of light and the sight mechanism, a collection of spectral lamps and displays on photo stories.
- The third hall, there is a panorama of Venetian glass, a collection of one hundred forty four Abbe optical glasses, samples of the first experimental laser cores and fiber-optical elements with actual industrial equipment.
