= Franz Seraph von Destouches =

German composer

Franz Seraph von Destouches (21 January 1772 – 9 December 1844) was a German composer. Taught by Joseph Haydn, Destouches wrote incidental music to some plays by Friedrich Schiller. He also wrote a symphony in D major, a piano concerto, a clarinet concerto, operas, masses, marches, etc.
