= Monster (physics) =

Arrangement of matter that has maximum disorder

A monster, in quantum physics, is an arrangement of matter that has maximum disorder. The high-entropy state of monsters has been theorized as being responsible for the high entropy of black holes; while the likelihood of any given star entering a "monster" state while collapsing is small, quantum mechanics takes into account all possible outcomes so the monster's entropy has to be taken into account when calculating black hole entropy.
