= Magnetic translation =

In quantum mechanics, the action of symmetries on physical states are represented by either linear or, more generally, projective representations. For a particle moving in a crystal without a magnetic field, spatial translations are represented linearly and the corresponding translation operators commute with one another and with the Hamiltonian. However, in the presence of a magnetic field, even when the magnetic field configuration is translationally invariant, wave functions fail to transform linearly under translation. Instead, they are represented projectively, acquiring position-dependent phase factors. The resulting operators are known as magnetic translation operator.

== Magnetic Symmetry Operator ==
In this section, we will start with the discussion of the more well-known magnetic translation operator and generalize it to other spatial symmetries such as rotations.

=== Magnetic Translation Operator ===
To be more specific, consider the Hamiltonian of a quantum particle (with charge $q$ and mass $m$) in a magnetic field explicitly depends on the magnetic vector potential ${\bf A}({\bf r})$, where ${\bf B} = \nabla \times {\bf A}({\bf r })$:

$H = \frac {[{\bf p} - q{\bf A}({\bf r })]^2}{2m } + V({\bf r })$.

For a uniform magnetic field ${\bf B}({\bf r}) = B \hat z$, the ordinary translation operator $T({\bf a }) = e^{-i {\bf p} \cdot {\bf a}/\hbar }$ does not commute with the Hamiltonian even when $V({\bf r + a}) = V({\bf r})$ because

$T({\bf a })^{-1}[{\bf p} - q{\bf A}({\bf r })]T({\bf a }) = {\bf p} - q{\bf A}({\bf r + a }) = {\bf p} - q{\bf A}({\bf r }) -q[ {\bf A}({\bf r+ a}) - {\bf A}({\bf r}) ] = {\bf p} - q{\bf A}({\bf r }) - q \nabla \chi_{\bf a }({\bf r }).$

In the third equality, one writes ${\bf A}({\bf r+ a}) - {\bf A}({\bf r}) = \nabla \chi_{\bf a}({\bf r})$ using the fact that

$\nabla \times \left [{\bf A}({\bf r+ a}) - {\bf A}({\bf r}) \right ] = {\bf B}({\bf r+a}) -{\bf B}({\bf r}) = 0.$

For a uniform magnetic field, this has a solution (which can be identified through vector calculus identities):

$\chi_{\bf a }({\bf r}) = \int_{\bf r}^{\bf r+a } {\bf A}\cdot d{\bf \ell} +{\bf B}\times {\bf a} \cdot {\bf r } + \text{Const.}$

Here, the line integral should be taken along a straight line. The failure of $T({\bf a })$ to commute with the Hamiltonian is due to the $- q \nabla \chi_{\bf a }({\bf r })$ term. One could remedy this by multiplying $T({\bf a })$ by an appropriate phase factor:

$M({\bf a }) = e^{-\frac i {\hbar} {\bf p}\cdot {\bf a} } e^{\frac {i q \chi_{\bf a}({\bf r })}{\hbar} } = e^{\frac {i q \chi_{\bf a}({\bf r -a})}{\hbar} } e^{-\frac i {\hbar} {\bf p}\cdot {\bf a} } .$

$M({\bf a})$ then commutes with the Hamiltonian for any $\bf a$. In particular, the translation along ${\bf a}$ and ${\bf b}$ satisfy

$[H, M({\bf a})] = 0 \text { and } [H, M({\bf b})] = 0$.

But they fail to commute with each other in general; instead, they satisfy

$M({\bf a}) M({\bf b})= e^{\frac{iq}{\hbar} {\bf B}\cdot {\bf a}\times{\bf b}} M({\bf b})M({\bf a}) = e^{\frac {iq}{2\hbar } {\bf B}\cdot {\bf a}\times{\bf b}} M({\bf a} + {\bf b}).$

Thus the failure of the commutativity of two translations is captured by the flux $\Phi = Ba b$ through the rectangle enclosed by the two translations. In particular, the two magnetic translations commute whenever this flux is an integer multiple of the flux quantum $\Phi_0 = \frac {2\pi \hbar }{q },$

i.e., $\Phi = n \Phi_0$ $[M({\bf a}),M({\bf b})] = 0$.

The magnetic translation operators $M({\bf a})$ and $M({\bf b})$ now form a set of commuting symmetry operators.
