= Manuel Mateus Ventura =

- Born: 17 June 1921; Fortaleza, Ceará, Brazil
- Died: 31 December 2018 (aged 97)
- Occupations: Biophysicist, biochemist, and educator
- Title: Professor emeritus
- Board member of: Institute of Chemistry and Technology at UFC (founder, 1958); Brazilian Academy of Sciences; Brazilian Order of Scientific Merit
- Awards: Anísio Teixeira Prize (1981)

Academic background
- Education: Federal University of Ceará

Academic work
- Discipline: Agronomy
- Sub-discipline: Plant biochemistry and edaphology
- Scientific career
- Known for: To understand "the action of metabolic inhibitors on the opening and closing of stomata" and (2) to understand "the action of antibiotics on the growth of higher plants"
- Workplaces: Federal University of Ceará (1950-1970); University of Brasília (1970-1992)

Manuel Mateus Ventura (17 June 1921 in Fortaleza, Ceará – 31 December 2018) was a Brazilian biophysicist, biochemist, and educator.

Ventura graduated with a degree in agronomy from the Federal University of Ceará (UFC) in 1943, and then took a position as assistant professor of organic chemistry in the same department. At that time, scientific research in Brazilian universities was not well supported, especially in the northeastern part of the country, and there was little scientific infrastructure. Ventura's research career began with a series of theoretical calculations of physicochemical properties of organic compounds based on data in the published literature. He became full professor in 1950, and initiated a program of research in plant biochemistry and edaphology a branch of soil science. The aims of this research program were (1) to understand "the action of metabolic inhibitors on the opening and closing of stomata" and (2) to understand "the action of antibiotics on the growth of higher plants". Ventura was instrumental in the founding of the Institute of Chemistry and Technology at UFC in 1958, and served as its director until 1968.

In 1970 Ventura was invited to the University of Brasília (UnB) as visiting professor, where he headed the Department of Cell Biology. His research at this time focussed on the structure of proteins and protein-protein interaction. He became full professor at UnB in 1975 and in 1992 he became professor emeritus. After retirement he continued to work in the area of computer simulation of biomolecules.

Ventura was member of the Brazilian Academy of Sciences, a member of the Brazilian Order of Scientific Merit (Great Cross), and, in 1981, one of the inaugural recipients of the Anísio Teixeira Prize from the Ministry of Education.
