= Minh Quang Tran =

Vietnamese scientist

Minh Quang Trần
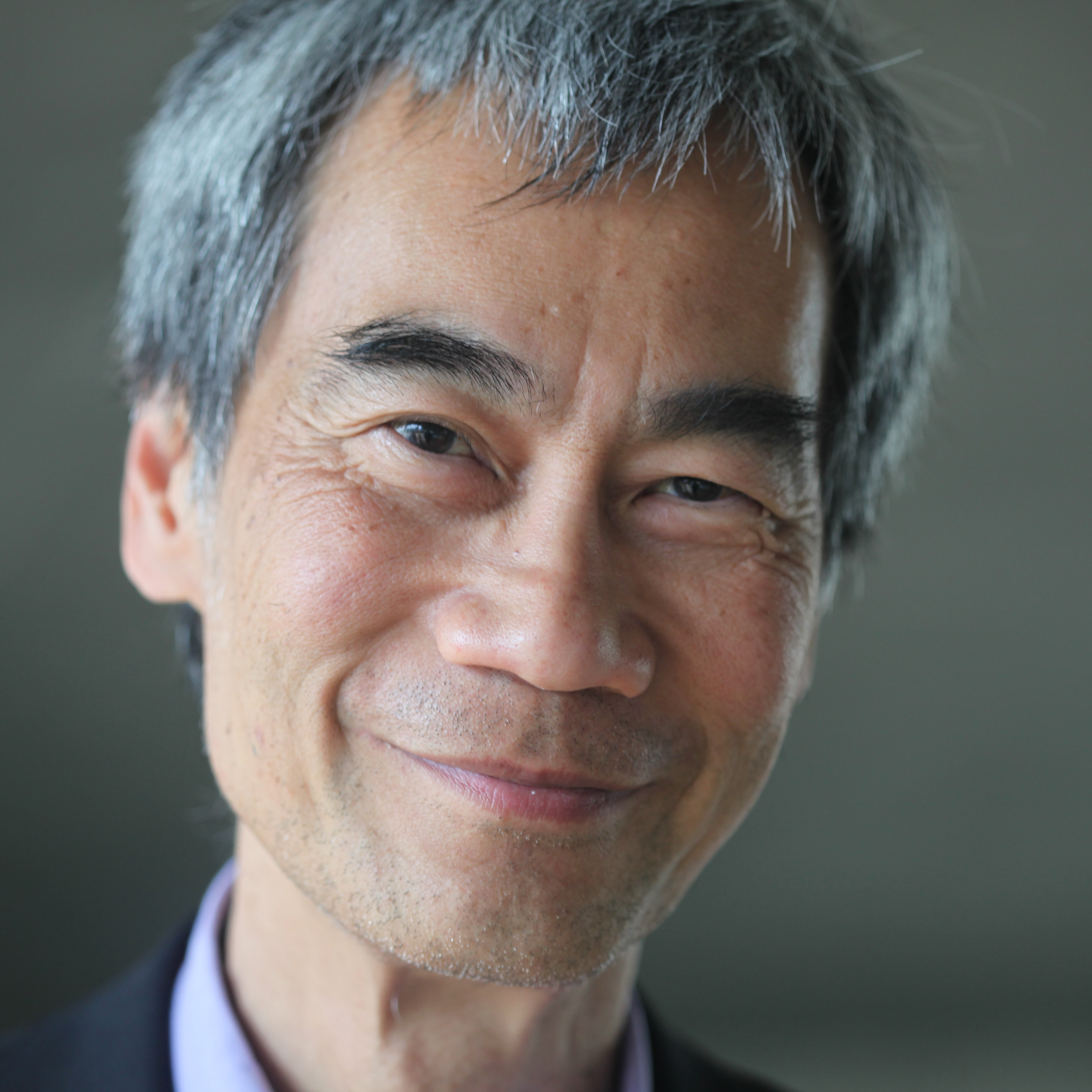
- Trần in 2010
- Born: 30 May 1951 (age 75); Saigon
- Education: EPFL
- Scientific career
- Fields: Plasma physics

Minh-Quảng Trần (born in Saigon (Vietnam) on 30 May 1951) is a professor at the EPFL.

He graduated in physics at the Swiss Federal Institute of Technology (EPFL) in 1973, where he did his doctoral thesis in 1977, and where he has worked as a professor since 1980. He works at the Swiss Plasma Center (SPC), with the Tokamak à configuration variable.

He was nominated Leader of EFDA (the European Fusion Development Agreement), the organisation which manages JET (Joint European Torus), the largest fusion experiment in the world, sited in England. It also supervises numerous technology programmes in Europe in support of ITER, the international experimental fusion reactor project, as well as research for future industrial reactors.

Trần was chair of the Commission on Plasma Physics (C16) of the International Union of Pure and Applied Physics from 2017 to 2021.
