= Mechanical similarity =

In classical mechanics, a branch overlapping in physics and applied mathematics, mechanical similarity occurs when the potential energy is a homogeneous function of the positions of the particles, with the result that the trajectories of the particles in the system are geometrically similar paths, differing in size but retaining shape.

Consider a system of any number of particles and assume that the interaction energy between any pair of particles has the form

$$U(r)\propto r^k \,,$$

where r is the distance between the two particles. In such a case the solutions to the equations of motion are a series of geometrically similar paths, and the times of motion t at corresponding points on the paths are related to the linear size l of the path by

$$t \propto l^{1-k/2}.$$

== Examples ==
- The period of small oscillations (k = 2) is independent of their amplitude.
- The time of free fall under gravity (k = 1) is proportional to the square root of the initial altitude.
- The square of the time of revolution of the planets (k = −1) is proportional to the cube of the orbital size.

== See also ==
- Virial theorem
