= Optical manipulation of atoms =

The manipulation of atoms using optical fields is a vital and fundamental area of research within the field of atomic physics. This research revolves around leveraging the distinct characteristics of laser light and coherent optical fields to achieve precise control over various aspects of atomic systems. These aspects encompass regulating atomic motion, positioning atoms, manipulating internal states, and facilitating intricate interactions with neighboring atoms and photons. The utilization of optical fields provides a powerful toolset for exploring and understanding the quantum behavior of atoms and opens up promising avenues for applications in atomic, molecular, and optical physics.

== Techniques ==
=== Optical tweezers ===
Optical tweezers are a powerful and versatile tool used in atomic physics. Developed in the 1970s by Arthur Ashkin, optical tweezers have revolutionized research in various fields, enabling scientists to study the behavior of individual particles and explore fundamental phenomena. The development of optical tweezers resulted in Ashkin receiving the Nobel Prize in Physics in 2018.

The underlying principle of optical tweezers relies on the transfer of momentum from the photons in the laser beam to the trapped particle. When a tightly focused laser beam interacts with a small particle, the variation in the intensity of the laser light creates an attractive force towards the region of highest intensity. This force effectively traps the particle at the focal point of the laser beam.

The trapping force generated by the optical tweezers depends on several factors, including the intensity of the laser beam, the refractive index of the particle and the surrounding medium, and the size and shape of the particle. By adjusting these parameters, researchers can control the strength and stability of the trapping potential.

=== Optical molasses ===
Steven Chu, along with Claude Cohen-Tannoudji and William D. Phillips, were awarded the Nobel Prize in Physics in 1997 for their groundbreaking contributions to the development of methods to laser cool and trap atoms with laser light. Chu and his colleagues developed a technique called "optical molasses", which involved using carefully tuned laser beams to slow down and cool atoms in three dimensions. This process was akin to slowing down the atoms and confining them using an "optical trap".

Optical molasses relies on the interaction between atoms and laser light to slow down the atoms' movement. This process takes advantage of the fact that atoms can absorb and emit photons when they are exposed to laser light of specific frequencies.

The basic idea is to use laser beams that are red-detuned from an atomic transition. Red-detuned means that the frequency of the laser light is lower than the natural resonance frequency of the atoms. When atoms encounter such red-detuned laser light, they experience a "light shift", which creates a spatially dependent potential energy landscape.

In the context of optical molasses, the term "molasses" refers to the slowing down of atoms, analogous to how molasses slows down the movement of objects moving through it. The molasses effect in laser cooling arises from the spatially varying light shift created by the red-detuned laser beams.

When an atom moves in the presence of the laser beams, it experiences a varying light shift due to the intensity gradient of the laser light. This variation in the light shift creates an optical force that opposes the atom's motion, causing it to slow down. Atoms moving in the direction opposite to the laser beams experience the largest light shifts, leading to effective cooling.

=== Magneto-optical trap ===
A magneto-optical trap (MOT) confines and manipulates atoms using the combined action of magnetic fields and laser light. This innovative approach has paved the way for significant advancements in quantum optics, quantum information processing, and precision measurements.

The first step in the operation of a MOT involves the cooling of atoms using beams in an Optical Molasses configuration (discussed in the section above). However, Optical Molasses only creates a velocity-dependent damping force. To truly trap atoms, a position-dependent restorative force must be established.

This is accomplished through magnetic fields are employed in conjunction with the laser cooling mechanism. A quadrupolar magnetic field is created (typically by an Anti-Helmholtz Coil). Quadrupolar magnetic fields vary approximately linearly in space near their zero. This creates a position-dependent energy shift through Zeeman Splitting. Tuning the laser polarization to drive only the lower energy transition, (see Selection rules for more information) atoms moving away from the magnetic field zero will absorb a lower energy photon in a collision, absorbing the photon's momentum and being pushed towards the magnetic field zero. The atom is now in an excited state and will emit a photon and recoil, but in random directions, thus leading to an average force on the atom of zero. Thus a restorative force is created and the atoms will be trapped.

=== Optical lattice ===
An Optical lattice is a periodic potential formed by the interference of counter-propagating laser beams, creating a standing wave pattern of light that can trap neutral atoms at the antinodes or nodes of the field via the dipole force. First demonstrated in the late 1980s and 1990s, optical lattices have become a key tool in atomic, molecular, and optical physics. Their development was driven by the need to study quantum gases and simulate condensed matter systems in a highly controlled environment.

The principle of an optical lattice relies on the AC Stark effect: atoms experience a spatially varying potential proportional to the intensity of the light field. By adjusting the laser wavelength, polarization, and geometry, researchers can tailor the dimensionality (1D, 2D, or 3D) and depth of the lattice potential. Lattices are typically categorized as red-detuned (atoms trapped at intensity maxima) or blue-detuned (trapped at minima), and can be extended to more complex geometries such as spin-dependent lattices or superlattices.

Optical lattices continue to be a platform for exploring quantum phase transitions, high-precision metrology, and fundamental tests of quantum mechanics.

== Applications ==
=== Laser cooling ===
Optical manipulation techniques are essential to laser cooling because precise control of light frequency, polarization, and intensity enables targeted interaction with atomic transitions. Laser cooling is broadly divided into Doppler cooling, in which atomic samples are limited by the recoil limit associated with the minimum kinetic after having emitted a photon; sub-Doppler cooling (such as polarization gradient cooling), which can achieve temperatures well below the Doppler limit. These methods form the basis for many advanced applications, including atomic clocks, Bose–Einstein condensation, and quantum information processing.

Doppler cooling involves using laser light that is red-detuned from an atomic transition, which means the laser frequency is higher than the natural resonance frequency of the atoms. When atoms move towards the laser beam, they experience a higher frequency light shift, resulting in an optical force that slows them down. Doppler cooling is effective for cooling atoms along one direction but fails to cool atoms in all three dimensions.

Optical molasses overcomes this limitation by employing multiple laser beams with different propagation directions and polarizations. The combined effect of the different beams allows cooling in all three dimensions, effectively trapping the atoms in the regions of lowest light intensity.

=== Quantum computation ===
Atoms can be used as qubits in quantum computing. The precise control offered by optical manipulation allows scientists to encode and manipulate quantum information in the quantum states of individual atoms. Laser beams and optical fields can coherently control the quantum states of atoms, enabling the creation of reliable qubits. Precision laser pulses are used to manipulate individual quantum bits, enabling operations such as single-qubit rotations and two-qubit entangling gates. For example, in trapped ion quantum computers, laser-driven transitions between internal states of ions allow for the realization of fundamental quantum logic gates, including high-fidelity entangling operations like the Mølmer–Sørensen gate.

Optical manipulation techniques, such as laser cooling, can lead to long coherence times for atoms. Coherence time refers to the time during which a quantum system can maintain its quantum superposition state before decoherence occurs. Long coherence times are essential for performing quantum operations and minimizing errors in quantum computations.

Quantum computing relies heavily on the phenomenon of entanglement, where qubits become deeply interconnected and share correlations that are impossible to reproduce classically. Optical manipulation can create and control entangled states of atoms, enabling the implementation of quantum algorithms and computational speedup.

Optical manipulation techniques can be readily scaled to control larger numbers of atoms, paving the way for building scalable quantum computers. The ability to trap and manipulate arrays of atoms using optical lattices allows for the creation of larger and more complex quantum circuits. An example of controlling larger numbers of atoms can be seen in the manipulation of a BEC using counter propagating waves.

=== Atomic clocks ===
Optical manipulation involves laser cooling and trapping of atoms, reducing their kinetic energy to extremely low temperatures. This process allows scientists to create ultracold atomic ensembles with minimal thermal motion, leading to narrow linewidths in atomic transitions. Narrow linewidths are essential for achieving high precision in atomic clocks. Laser cooling and optical manipulation can also extend the coherence time of atomic states, reducing the sensitivity of atomic clocks to external disturbances. Longer coherence times translate into increased clock stability, allowing atomic clocks to maintain their precision over longer intervals.

Furthermore, lasers are used for state preparation and measurement: optical pumping initializes qubits into well-defined states, while state-dependent fluorescence enables high-contrast readout. In more complex protocols, such as quantum logic spectroscopy, laser fields couple different species of ions via shared motional modes, allowing precise manipulation and indirect measurements.

=== Manipulation of a Bose–Einstein condensate (BEC) using a standing light wave ===
The manipulation of a Bose–Einstein condensate (BEC) using a standing light wave is an important technique in the field of atomic physics. A Bose-Einstein condensate is a state of matter that emerges when a group of atoms is cooled to extremely low temperatures, approaching absolute zero. Within this state, all the atoms composing the condensate converge into a single quantum state with macroscopic quantum coherence and behave as a unified, wave-like entity.

One way to manipulate a BEC is by subjecting it to a standing light wave, which is formed by two counter-propagating laser beams. The frequency of these lasers is carefully chosen to match the energy difference between specific atomic energy levels, creating resonant interactions with the atoms in the condensate.

The key phenomenon at play here is the two-photon recoil process. When a cold atom in the BEC absorbs a photon from one of the laser beams, it gains energy and gets excited to a higher energy level. Almost instantaneously, the atom emits a photon in the opposite direction, in the other laser beam, and returns to its initial state. As a result of this two-photon process, the atom receives a net momentum kick with a magnitude of 2ħk (where ħ is the reduced Planck constant and k is the magnitude of the wave vector of the laser) in the direction of the absorbed photon.

Due to this momentum kick, the BEC cloud, which initially sits at the center of a trap, is split into two identical clouds. These two clouds then travel in opposite directions with a velocity proportional to the momentum kick they receive from the absorbed photons.

This manipulation of a BEC using a standing light wave is significant for several reasons:

1. It allows precise control of the position and motion of the BEC cloud
2. Splitting the BEC into two identical clouds is useful for studying quantum interference and coherence effects.
3. This technique is crucial for investigating quantum phenomena and understanding the behavior of quantum gases at ultra-cold temperatures.
4. The controlled manipulation of BECs using optical fields has promising applications in quantum information processing, precision measurements, and quantum simulation.

This leads to the creation of extremely narrow and well-defined atomic resonances. These narrow resonances enable more precise measurement of atomic transitions, resulting in more accurate frequency references for atomic clocks.
