= Middle World =

Scale between microscopic and cosmic

"Middle World", a term coined by evolutionary biologist Richard Dawkins, is used to describe the realm generally experienced by humans that lies between the microscopic world of quarks and atoms and the cosmic world of stars and galaxies. It also refers to the lack of appreciation humans generally have for the spectrum of time, from picoseconds to billions of years, because people generally refer to time in units of minutes or hours or weeks and live for only a portion of a century. This term is used as an explanation of oddity at both extreme levels of existence. We have a lack of understanding of the quantum and molecular parts of the universe, because the human mind has evolved to understand best that which it routinely encounters.

Dawkins discusses our limitations in perceiving and contemplating the micro and macro realms outside of our "middle world" in his 2005 TED talk entitled "Queerer than we can suppose: the strangeness of science". He again uses the term later in his 2006 book, The God Delusion, writing, "...the way we see the world, and the reason why we find some things intuitively easy to grasp and others hard, is that our brains themselves are evolved organs: on-board computers, evolved to help us survive in a world — I shall use the name Middle World — where the objects that mattered to our survival were neither very large nor very small; a world where things either stood still or moved slowly compared with the speed of light; and where the very improbable could be safely treated as impossible."

== Bibliography ==
- Book, Middle World: The Restless Heart of Matter and Life, Mark Haw ISBN 1-4039-8603-7
