= Modern Physics and Ancient Faith =

2003 book by Stephen M. Barr

- Author: Stephen M. Barr
- Publication date: 2003

Modern Physics and Ancient Faith (2003) is a book by Stephen M. Barr, a physicist from the University of Delaware and frequent contributor to First Things. This book is "an extended attack" on what Barr calls scientific materialism. National Review says of the book: "[A] lucid and engaging survey of modern physics and its relation to religious belief. . . . Barr has produced a stunning tour de force . . . [a] scientific and philosophical breakthrough."

== Contents ==
The book is divided into five parts spanning 26 chapters. The main religious and philosophical themes include determinism, mind as a machine, anthropic principle, and the Big Bang theory. Its main thesis is that science and religion only appear in conflict because many have "conflated science with philosophical materialism."

== Reviews ==
- James F. Salmon. Theological Studies March 2005 v66 i1 p207(3)
- Stephen P. Weldon. Isis, Dec 2004 v95 i4 p742(2)
- Alan G. Padgett. Theology Today July 2004 v61 i2 p229(4)
- Kirk Wegter-McNelly. The Journal of Religion April 2004 v84 i2 p302(2)
- Robin Collins, First Things: A Monthly Journal of Religion and Public Life Nov 2003 i137 p54(4)
- Ray Olson, Booklist, Oct 1, 2003 v100 i3 p285(1)
- Choice: Current Reviews for Academic Libraries, Oct 2003 v41 i2 p377
- The Christian Century Sept 6, 2003 v120 i18 p39(2)
- Catholic Library World Sept 2003 v74 p37
- Human Events June 2, 2003 v59 p16
- "Signposts of the Divine", Joshua Gilder, National Review April 21, 2003 v55 i7 pNA
- Augustine J. Curley, Library Journal, March 15, 2003 v128 i5 p88(1)
- Bryce Christensen. Booklist Feb 1, 2003 v99 i11 p959(1)

== See also ==
- Issues in Science and Religion
