= Marcel Audiffren =

French Cistercian priest, physicist, and inventor

- Occupations: Priest, physicist, inventor

Marcel Audiffren was a French priest, physicist, and inventor who promoted the residential refrigerator. He served as abbot of his Cistercian monastery, and originally designed a hand-cranked device for cooling liquid, such as wine, for his monks. His machine was patented in France in 1894. The patent stated "It can be cranked by hand or driven by an engine."

European-manufactured refrigerators based on his designs were first sold in the U.S. in 1903. He received U.S. Patents #551,107 (in 1895) and #898,400 (in 1908, with Albert Sigrun). These patents were purchased by C. A. Griscom for his American Audiffren Refrigerating Machine Company.

Machines based on Audiffren's sulfur dioxide process were manufactured by General Electric in Fort Wayne, Indiana and marketed by the Johns-Manville company. The first unit was sold in 1911. Audiffren machines were expensive, selling for about $1,000—about twice as much as an automobile cost at the time.
