= Munir Nayfeh =

Palestinian american physicist

Munir Hasan Nayfeh is a Palestinian-American particle physicist, renowned for his pioneering work in nanotechnology. Nayfeh was born in December 1945, in the neighborhood of Shweikeh in Tulkarem city, in what was then Mandatory Palestine. Following the 1948 Palestine war and Palestinian exodus, Nayfeh's family was compelled to settle in Jordan, where he received his Thanaweyeh Ammeh (high school diploma). He received his bachelor's degree in 1968, and his master's in physics in 1970 from the American University of Beirut, after which he won a scholarship to pursue his PhD at Stanford University in the US, which he successfully completed in 1974.

== Education and career ==
Professor Nayfeh joined the Oak Ridge National Laboratory in 1974 as a postdoctoral fellow and research physicist. In 1977 he was appointed as a lecturer at Yale University. He finally joined the University of Illinois at Urbana–Champaign in 1978 as a professor of physics. He published over 130 papers and 10 books, and holds several patents. Nayfeh is most noted for his pioneering work in nanotechnology and in 1974 published a milestone paper with one of the 2005 Nobel Prize Laureate in Physics Theodor W. Hänsch on a precision measurement of the Rydberg Constant. Professor Nayfeh is also the founder of NanoSi Advanced Technology Inc., which commercializes nano-sized silicon particles for solar energy, electronics, solid state lighting, and biomedicine applications.
