= Materials and Structures =

- Discipline: Materials science, engineering
- Language: English
- Edited by: Giovanni Plizzari

Publication details
- History: 1968-present
- Publisher: Springer Science+Business Media
- Frequency: Continuous
- Open access: Hybrid
- Impact factor: 3.428 (2020)

Standard abbreviations
- ISO 4: Mater. Struct.

Indexing
- ISSN: 1359-5997 (print); 1871-6873 (web)
- LCCN: 96660089
- OCLC no.: 25492750

Links
- Journal homepage; Journal page at society website

Materials and Structures is a peer-reviewed scientific journal published by Springer Science+Business Media on behalf of RILEM (the International Union of Laboratories and Experts in Construction Materials, Systems and Structures). It covers research on fundamental properties of building materials, their characterization and processing techniques, modeling, standardization of test methods, and the application of research results in building and civil engineering. Materials and Structures also publishes comprehensive reports prepared by RILEM Technical Committees. The current editor-in-chief is Giovanni Plizzari (University of Brescia).

== Abstracting and indexing ==
The journal is abstracted and indexed in:

- Academic OneFile
- Chemical Abstracts Service
- Compendex
- ProQuest
- Current Contents/Engineering
- GeoRef
- International Construction Database
- Materials Science Citation Index
- PASCAL
- Science Citation Index Expanded
- Scopus
- VINITI Database RAS

According to the Journal Citation Reports, the journal has a 2020 impact factor of 3.428.
