= Macroscopic quantum self-trapping =

Phenomenon in quantum mechanics

In quantum mechanics, macroscopic quantum self-trapping is when two Bose–Einstein condensates weakly linked by an energy barrier which particles can tunnel through, nevertheless end up with a higher average number of bosons on one side of the junction than the other. The junction of two Bose–Einstein condensates is mostly analogous to a Josephson junction, which is made of two superconductors linked by a non-conducting barrier. However, superconducting Josephson junctions do not display macroscopic quantum self-trapping, and thus macroscopic quantum self-tunneling is a distinguishing feature of Bose–Einstein condensate junctions. Self-trapping occurs when the self-interaction energy $\Lambda$ between the Bosons is larger than a critical value called $\Lambda^\text{MJJ}_c$.
$$\Lambda^\text{MJJ}_c = \frac{1+\sqrt{1-z(0)^2} \cos(\theta(0)+\theta_\text{A-C})}{z(0)^2/2}$$

It was first described in 1997. It has been observed in Bose–Einsten condensates of exciton-polaritons, and predicted for a condensate of magnons.

While the tunneling of a particle through classically forbidden barriers can be described by the particle's wave function, this merely gives the probability of tunneling. Although various factors can increase or decrease the probability of tunneling, one can not be certain whether or not tunneling will occur.

When two condensates are placed in a double potential well and the phase and population differences are such that the system is in equilibrium, the population difference will remain fixed. A naïve conclusion is that there is no tunneling at all, and the bosons are truly "trapped" on one side of the junction. However, macroscopic quantum self-trapping does not rule out quantum tunneling — rather, only the possibility of observing tunneling is ruled out. In the event that a particle tunnels through the barrier, another particle tunnels in the opposite direction. Because the identity of individual particles is lost in that case, no tunneling can be observed, and the system is considered to remain at rest.

== See also ==
- Double-well potential
- Gross–Pitaevskii equation
