= MOCADI =

MOCADI is a Monte Carlo simulation program used to calculate the transport of charged particle beams--as well as fragmentation and fission products from nuclear reactions in target materials--through ion optical systems described by transfer matrices (including up to third order Taylor expansion coefficients) and through layers of matter.
