= Molecular electronic transducers =

Class of inertial sensors

Molecular electronic transducers (MET) are a class of inertial sensors (which include accelerometers, gyroscopes, tilt meters, seismometers, and related devices) based on an electrochemical mechanism. METs capture the physical and chemical phenomena that occur at the surface of electrodes in electrochemical cells as the result of hydrodynamic motion. They are a specialized kind of electrolytic cell designed so that motion of the MET, which causes movement (convection) in the liquid electrolyte, can be converted to an electronic signal proportional to acceleration or velocity. MET sensors have inherently low noise and high amplification of signal (on the order of 10^{6}).

== History of molecular electronic transducers ==
MET technology had its origins in the 1950s, when it was discovered that very sensitive, low-power, low-noise detectors and control devices could be made based on specially designed electrochemical cells (which were referred to as “solions”, derived from the words solution and ions). Up through the 1970s, the US Navy and others supported development of solion devices for sensitive sonar and seismic applications, and a number of patents were filed. However, early solion devices had a number of serious problems such as lack of reproducibility and poor linearity, and practical production of devices was abandoned in the US and progress languished for decades.

However, fundamental physics and mathematical studies of the underlying electrochemical and fluid flow dynamical processes continued, principally in Russia, where the field came to be known as “molecular electronics”. In recent years both mathematical modeling and fabrication capabilities improved dramatically, and a number of high-performance MET devices have been developed.

== Principles of operation ==
At the heart of a MET device are two (or more) inert electrodes at which a reversible redox reaction occurs, which does not involve either plating of a metal or evolution of a gas. Typically, the aqueous iodide-triiodide couple is used:

3 I^{−} → I_{3}^{−} + 2 e^{−} anode reaction

I_{3}^{−} + 2 e^{−} → 3 I^{−} cathode reaction

When a voltage in the range of ~ 0.2 to 0.9V is applied across the electrodes, these two reactions occur in a continuous fashion. After a short time, the electrochemical reactions deplete the concentration of triiodide ions [I_{3}^{−}] at the cathode and enrich it at the anode, creating a concentration gradient of [I_{3}^{−}] between the electrodes. When the cell is motionless, the electrochemical reaction is limited by the diffusion of I_{3}^{−} to the cathode (a slow process), and the current dies down to a low steady-state value.

Motion of the device causes convection (stirring) in the electrolyte. This brings more I_{3}^{−} to the cathode, which in turn causes an increase in the cell current proportional to the motion. This effect is very sensitive, with extremely small motions causing measurable (and low noise) inertial signals.

In practice, the design of the electrodes to create a device with good performance (high linearity, wide dynamic range, low distortion, small settling time) is a complex hydrodynamic problem.

== Advantages of MET sensors ==
The main advantage of MET sensors over competing inertial technologies is their combination of size, performance and cost. MET sensors have performance comparable to fiber optic gyroscopes (FOGs) and ring laser gyros (RLGs) at a size close to that of MEMS sensors, and at potentially low cost (in the tens to hundreds of dollars range, in production). In addition, the fact that they have a liquid inertial mass with no moving parts makes them rugged and shock tolerant (basic survivability has been demonstrated to >20 kG); they are also inherently radiation hard.

== Applications ==
Depending on the configuration of the MET device, a variety of inertial sensors can be produced including:

- Linear accelerometers
- Linear velocity meters
- Seismic sensors
- Seismometers
- Angular accelerometers
- Angular rate sensors
- Gyroscopes
- Tiltmeters
- Pressure transducers
