= Mohammad Khorrami (physicist) =

Iranian physicist

Mohammad Khorrami, an Iranian mathematical physicist (born October 4, 1966, Tehran) is professor of physics at Alzahra University, Tehran.

== Education ==
Competing with over half a million applicants, Mohammad Khorrami ranked first in national university entrance exams (konkoor-e sarasari) of 1984 in Iran..

He graduated with the first rank from the department of Electrical Engineering at the University of Tehran. He started studying Physics at Sharif University in 1989 where he earned his Ph.D. after four years. He was among the third batch of Physicists who earned their Ph.D. in Iran.

== Career ==
He joined the Institute for Studies in Theoretical Physics and Mathematics as a research fellow and at the same time he became a faculty member at Tehran University. Later he became a faculty member of The Institute for Advanced Studies in Basic Sciences (IASBS) before moving to Alzahra University. He is already a Physics faculty member and in the Theoretical Physics group by "A.Aghamohammadi", "A. Shariati", "A.H. Fatollahi" and F. Roshani. His research has been concerned with a variety of problems in stochastic processes, conformal field theory, two-dimensional gauge theory, integrability and quantum groups and general relativity. As a physicist, he classifies his tasks under three categories of research, teaching and publicizing.

== Notable papers ==
He has published over 70 papers in peer-reviewed physics journals. Among them are:

- MRR Tabar, A Aghamohammadi & M. Khorrami "The logarithmic conformal field theories", Nuclear Physics B 497, 555-566 (1997)
- A Aghamohammadi, M. Khorrami & "A. Shariati" "Jordanian deformation of SL(2) as a contraction of the Drinfeld-Jimbo deformation of SL(2)", Journal of Physics A 28, L225-L231 (1995)
