= Medium Energy Ion Scattering Facility =

English research facility

The Medium Energy Ion Scattering facility (MEIS) is a major physics research facility based at The University of Huddersfield in West Yorkshire, England, previously located at Science and Technology Facilities Council (STFC) Daresbury Laboratory. The ion spectrometer provides industry and research scientists with a method for analysing surfaces using a positively charged beam on ions between 50 and 270 thousand electronvolts. This technique is particularly applicable to investigating crystalline structures and enables the structural arrangement, atomic mass and other details to be explored.
