= Paulette Destouches-Février =

French physicist and philosopher (1914–2013)

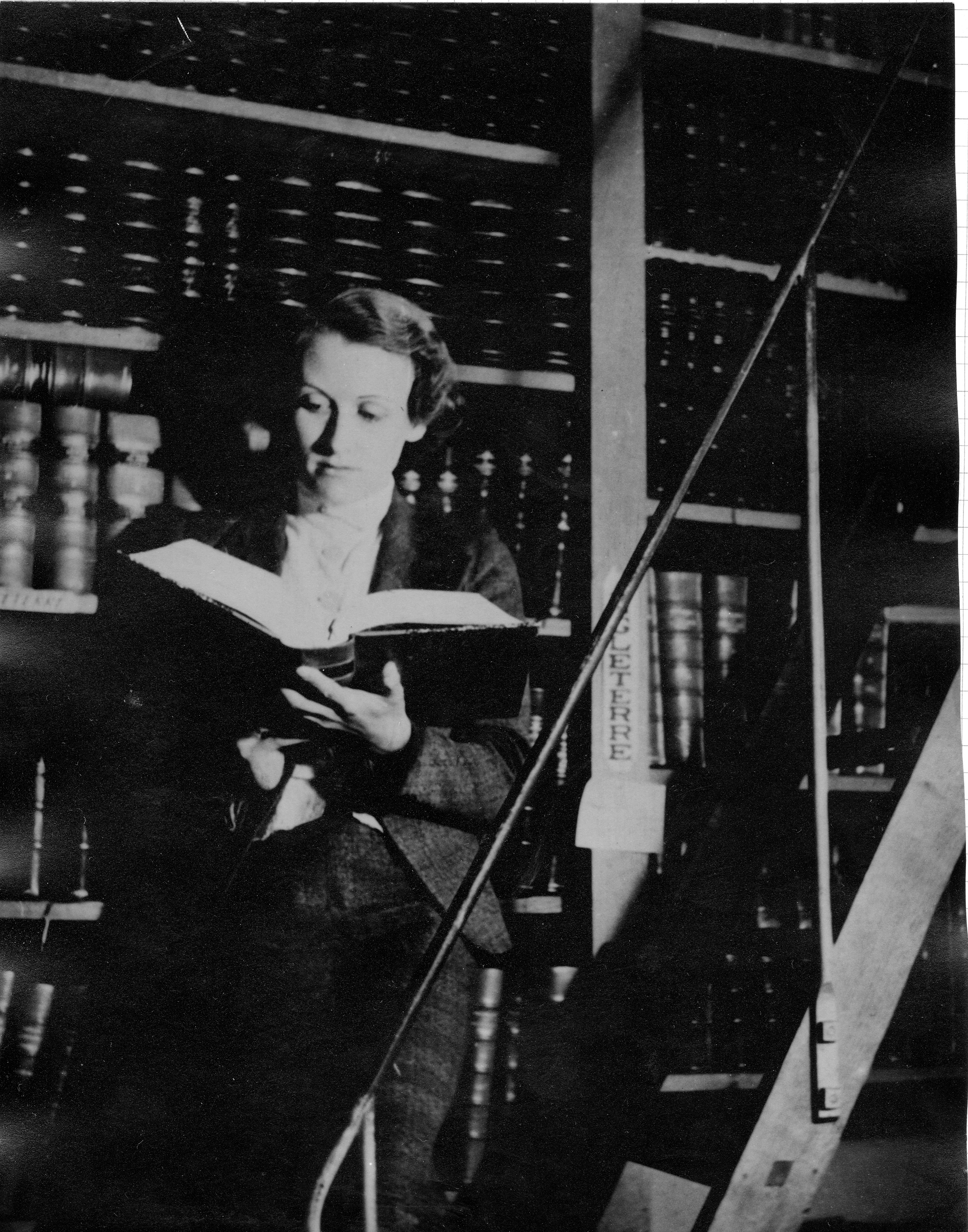
Paulette Destouches-Février (November 19, 1914 – November 1, 2013), French physicist, philosopher and logician, at the Poincarré Institute

Paulette Destouches-Février (née Fevrier,19 November 1914 – 1 November 2013) was a French physicist, philosopher of science, and logician.

She was widely credited by leading physicists and mathematicians of her time for her pioneering exploration of non-classical logic and her theorems that laid the foundations of quantum logic.

== Career ==
Paulette Février was born 19 November 1914 in Paris.

She obtained her baccalaureate in philosophy and elementary mathematics in Paris in 1933. She then pursued studies in philosophy at the Catholic Institute of Paris as well as at the Sorbonne, earning a teaching degree in philosophy in 1936 and a certificate in French literature in 1937

In 1936, she met the physicist Jean-Louis Destouches, who encouraged her to study physics to complement her education. She continued her studies in Dijon, first obtaining a Diplôme d'Études Supérieures (DES) in logic, and then resumed her physics studies in Paris, where she earned a DES in physics in 1939. She passed the agrégation in philosophy in 1940.

The same year, Gaston Bachelard cited her work on the Heisenberg principle and the Schrödinger equation in his book The Philosophy of No: A Philosophy of the New Scientific Mind, published in 1940 by Presses Universitaires de France, explaining that "the works of Mrs. Février prove that this logic is a three-valued logic.".

She then taught in several high schools in the provinces and in Paris, while continuing research work with Jean-Louis Destouches, whom she married in 1941. She presented her first doctoral thesis in 1945. She published several works on the philosophy of science, including Determinism and Indeterminism (Déterminisme et Indéterminisme), for which she received the Saintour Prize awarded by the Academy of Moral and Political Sciences (Académie des sciences morales et politiques),. On that occasion, journalist Jacqueline Piatier wrote on July 20, 1950, in Le Monde:

From her graduate diploma on a three-valued logic, the result of her reflections on the works of Mr. Louis de Broglie, a young student, Mrs. Février, entered the heart of the debate. She had the rare privilege, for academic exercises of this kind, of being cited by Gaston Bachelard in his Philosophy of No. She had just discovered the center of her thought. She would also find the center of her life there. For quantum physics, having led her to the Poincaré Institute, she met Jean-Louis Destouches, then a Doctor of Science, now a professor of theoretical physics at the Sorbonne, who completed her mathematical knowledge... and became her husband. Since then, guided by love, Mrs. Destouches, a philosophy agrégée, has made presentations to the Academy of Moral and Political Sciences, written in the Journal de Physique, and obtained a doctorate in mathematics.

In 1945, she published two papers discussing John von Neumann's no hidden variables proof in quantum mechanics.

She divorced Jean-Louis Destouches in 1950 but remained his intellectual companion until his death in 1980, and together they continued their collaborative work. She participated in the activities of several scientific associations and attended numerous international conferences on the philosophy of science, publishing scientific articles.

She left teaching in 1961 for a position as a CNRS engineer at the Blaise Pascal Institute, presented a second third-cycle doctoral thesis in statistical mathematics in 1967, devoted to the structure of experimental and predictive reasoning in physics, and then ended her career as a cultural advisor to the French Embassy in Sweden and director of the French Institute in Stockholm.

She died 1 November 2013 in Quimper.

== Honors/Awards ==
- Knight of the Order of Academic Palms (Chevalier de l’Ordre des Palmes académiques)

== Influential Positions ==
- Member of the Société Philomathique de Paris (1961)
- Member of the Council of the Association for Symbolic Logic (1963-1966)
- Member of the National Council for the History and Philosophy of Science
- Member of the Committee of the International Federation for Information Processing
- Member of the Editorial Board of the French Journal of Information Processing (Revue Française du Traitement de l'Information)
- Director of two scientific series at Editions
- Member of the International Academy of Philosophy of Science

== Selected publications ==
- Les Relations d'incertitude de Heisenberg et la logique (C.R. 204, 481, 1937)
- Sur l'indiscernabilité des corpuscules (DES de physique, Paris, 1937) – (J. Phys. Radium, s.VII, t.X, p. 307-323)
- "Sur les rapports entre la logique et la physique théorique; Logique adaptée aux théories quantiques". Comptes rendus hebdomadaires des séances de l'Académie des sciences. 219: 481–483. 1945.
- Relations d'incertitude liées à la complémentarité corpuscules-systèmes de Louis de Broglie (C.R. 226, 468, 1948)
- Sur la recherche de l'équation fonctionnelle de l'évolution d'un système en théorie générale des prévisions (C.R. 230, 1742, 1950)
- La Structure des théories physiques, PUF, coll. « Philosophie de la matière », 1951, 423 p.
- "Sur le caractère ouvert de la mécanique ondulatoire". J. Phys. Radium: 210–215. 1952..
- Déterminisme et indéterminisme, PUF, coll. « Philosophie de la matière », 1955, 250 p. Prix Saintour de l'Académie des Sciences morales et politiques)
- L'Interprétation physique de la mécanique ondulatoire et des théories quantiques, Gauthier-Villars, coll. « Les grands problèmes des sciences », 1956 216 p.,
- Logical structure of physical theories (Communication - Symposium on the Axiomatic method, Berkeley, Californie, 26 décembre 1958, North-Holland, Amsterdam, 1959, p. 376-389
- On the representation of the results of measurements by fuzzy sets (Communication au 3rd European Meeting on Cybernetics and Systems Research (EMCSR), Vienne, avril 1976, Proceedings, p. 321-324
- (éd. scientifique) Jean-Louis Destouches physicien et philosophe (1909-1980), avec Hervé Barreau & Georges Lochak, CNRS Éditions, Hermann, Grete, 1996.
- Refutation of determinism according to Laplace, by modern physics (Symposium, Académie internationale de philosophie des sciences, New-York, juillet 1977, "Abba Salama", Athènes 1978, vol. IX, p. 129-137

== Bibliography ==
- Hervé Barreau, « Paulette Destouches-Février », dans Béatrice Didier, Antoinette Fouque, Mireille Calle-Gruber (éd.), Le Dictionnaire universel des créatrices, Paris, Éditions des femmes, 2013 (lire en ligne).
