= Physical Review =

Peer-reviewed scientific journal

- Language: English
- Edited by: Robert Rosner

Publication details
- History: 1893–1913 Series I 1913–1970 Series II; 1970–present Series III; 1970–present Phys. Rev. A, B, C, D 1993–present Phys. Rev. E 1998–present Phys. Rev. AB; 2005–present Phys. Rev. PER; 2008–present Physics; 2011–present Phys. Rev. X 2014–present Phys. Rev. Applied; 2016–present Phys. Rev. Fluids; 2017–present Phys. Rev. Materials; 2019–present Phys. Rev. Research; 2020–present PRX Quantum
- Publisher: American Physical Society (United States)

Standard abbreviations
- ISO 4: Phys. Rev.

Indexing
- ISSN: 0031-899X (print); 1536-6065 (web)
- LCCN: 12037719
- OCLC no.: 01715212

Links
- Journal homepage

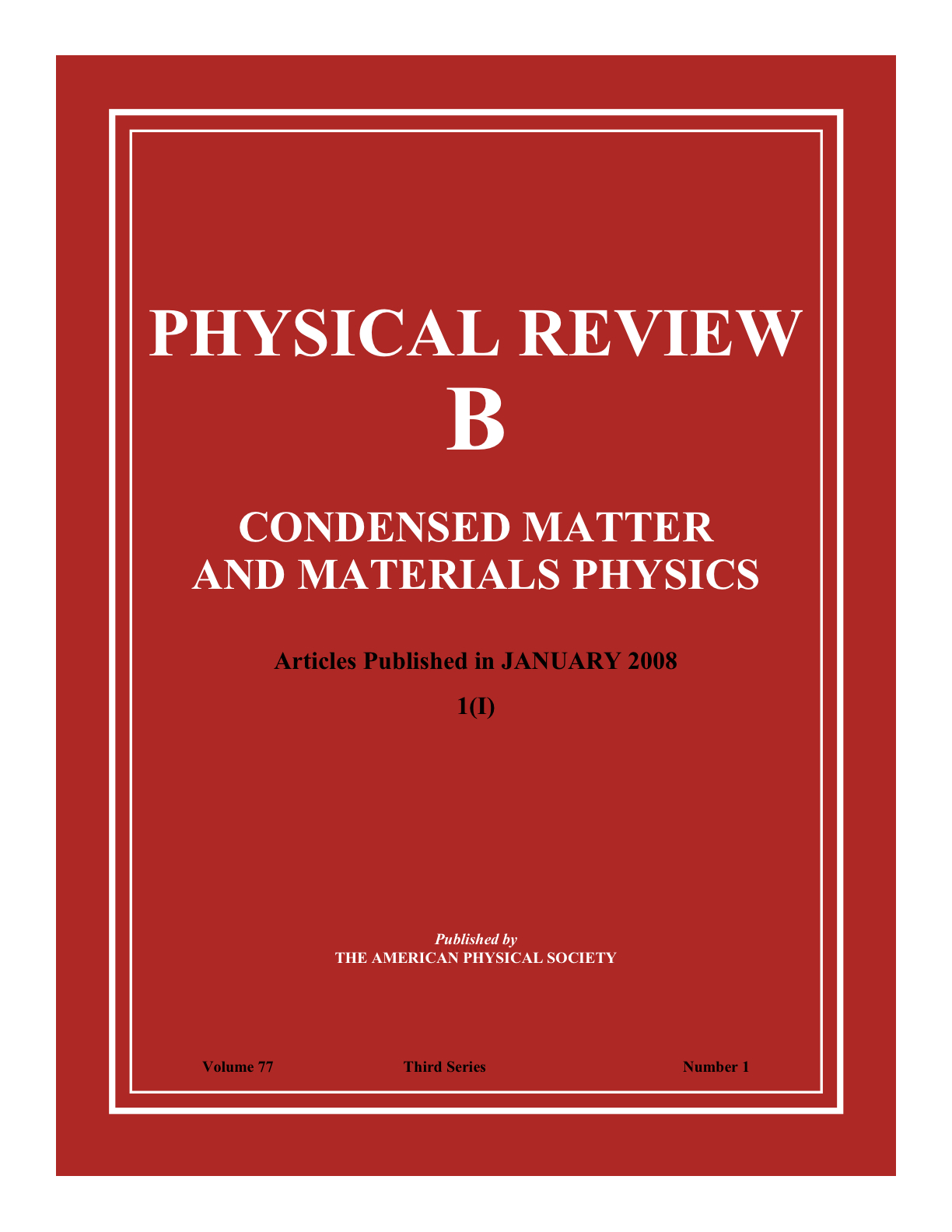
Front cover of the Physical Review

Physical Review is a peer-reviewed scientific journal. The journal was established in 1893 by Edward Nichols. It publishes original research as well as scientific and literature reviews on all aspects of physics. It is published by the American Physical Society (APS). The journal is in its third series, and is split in several sub-journals each covering a particular field of physics. It has a sister journal, Physical Review Letters, which publishes shorter articles of broader interest.

== History ==
Physical Review commenced publication in July 1893, organized by Cornell University professor Edward Nichols and helped by the new president of Cornell, J. Gould Schurman. The journal was managed and edited at Cornell in upstate New York from 1893 to 1913 by Nichols, Ernest Merritt, and Frederick Bedell. The 33 volumes published during this time constitute Physical Review Series I.

The American Physical Society (APS), founded in 1899, took over its publication in 1913 and started Physical Review Series II. The journal remained at Cornell under editor-in-chief G. S. Fulcher from 1913 to 1926, before relocating to the location of editor John Torrence Tate, Sr. (Note: Not to be confused with his son, the number theorist John Torrence Tate Jr.) at the University of Minnesota. In 1929, the APS started publishing Reviews of Modern Physics, a venue for longer review articles. In 1932, the newly formed American Institute of Physics took over publication of Physical Review.

During the Great Depression, wealthy scientist Alfred Loomis anonymously paid the journal's fees for authors who could not afford them.

After Tate's death in 1950, the journals were managed on an interim basis still in Minnesota by E. L. Hill and J. William Buchta until Samuel Goudsmit and Simon Pasternack were appointed and the editorial office moved to Brookhaven National Laboratory on Eastern Long Island, New York. In July 1958, the sister journal Physical Review Letters was introduced to publish short articles of particularly broad interest, initially edited by George L. Trigg, who remained as editor until 1988.

In 1970, Physical Review split into sub-journals Physical Review A, B, C, and D. A fifth member of the family, Physical Review E, was introduced in 1993 to a large part to accommodate the huge amount of new research in nonlinear dynamics. Combined, these constitute Physical Review Series III.

The editorial office moved in 1980 to its present location across the expressway from Brookhaven National Laboratory. Goudsmit retired in 1974 and Pasternack in the mid-1970s. Past Editors in Chief include David Lazarus (1980–1990; University of Illinois at Urbana–Champaign), Benjamin Bederson (1990–1996; New York University), Martin Blume (1996–2007; Brookhaven National Laboratory), and Gene Sprouse (2007–2015; SUNY Stony Brook). The current Editor in Chief is Robert Rosner, whose term began in March 2025.

To celebrate the hundredth anniversary of the journal, a memoir was published jointly by the APS and AIP.

In 1998, the first issue of Physical Review Special Topics: Accelerators and Beams was published, and in 2005, Physical Review Special Topics: Physics Education Research was launched. In January 2016 the names of both journals were changed to remove "Special Topics". Physical Review also started an online magazine, Physical Review Focus, in 1998 to explain and provide historical context for selected articles from Physical Review and Physical Review Letters. This was merged into Physics in 2011. The Special Topics journals are open access; Physics Education Research requires page charges from the authors, but Accelerators and Beams does not. Though not fully open access, Physical Review Letters also requires an author page charge, although this is voluntary. The other journals require such a charge only if manuscripts are not prepared in one of the preferred formats. Since 2011, authors can pay an article processing charge to make their papers open access. Such papers are published under the terms of the Creative Commons Attribution 3.0 License (CC-BY). Physical Review Letters celebrated their 50th birthday in 2008. The APS has a copyright policy to permit the author to reuse parts of the published article in a derivative or new work, including on Wikipedia.

The APS has an online publication entitled Physics, aiming to help physicists and physics students to learn about new developments outside of their own subfield. This now includes the general-interest articles that appeared as Physical Review Focus. A short-lived journal, also called Physics, was published by Pergamon Press and Physics Publishing Co. from 1964 through 1968, with the goal of printing "a selection of papers which are worth the attention of all physicists." The four volumes of this journal were eventually made freely available online by the APS under the alternative title Physics Physique Физика, reflecting how the title was originally printed on the journal covers and how it was sometimes referred to in the years since.

It also publishes Physical Review X, an online-only open access journal. It is a peer-reviewed journal that publishes, as timely as possible, original research papers from all areas of pure, applied, and interdisciplinary physics. In 2014 Physical Review Applied began publishing research across all aspects of experimental and theoretical applications of physics, including their interactions with other sciences, engineering, and industry. In 2016 the APS launched Physical Review Fluids "to include additional areas of fluid dynamics research", and in 2017 it launched Physical Review Materials "to fill a gap" in the coverage of materials research. In 2019 Physical Review Research was launched to provide a broad fully open-access journal at about the same selectivity level as the older A–E journals. In 2020, PRX Quantum was launched to provide a home for and connection between the numerous research communities that make up quantum information science and technology, spanning from pure science to engineering to computer science and beyond. In 2023 PRX Life was launched to advance research from the interdisciplinary communities at the interface of the physical and life sciences.

== Journals ==
Journal	ISO 4 abbreviation	Editor(s)	Impact factor (2025)	Published	Scope	ISSN
Physical Review Letters	Phys. Rev. Lett.	Rafael Fernandes; Robert Garisto Abhishek Agarwal Serena Dalena; Samindranath Mitra	9.4	1958–present	The full range of applied, fundamental, and interdisciplinary physics research topics	ISSN 0031-9007 (print); ISSN 1079-7114 (web)
Physical Review X	Phys. Rev. X	Denis Bartolo; Ling Miao	16.8	2011–present	PRX covers the full spectrum of subject areas in physics and pays particular attention to innovative interdisciplinary research of wide impact	ISSN 2160-3308 (web)
PRX Energy	PRX Energy	David Scanlon Jacilynn (Brant) Otero Margaret Hudson		2021– present	PRX Energy is a highly selective, open access journal featuring energy science and technology research with an emphasis on outstanding and lasting impact.	ISSN 2768-5608 (web)
PRX Quantum	PRX Quantum	Stephen Bartlett; Katiuscia N. Cassemiro	12.3	2020–present	PRX Quantum publishes research in quantum information science and technology, spanning from pure science to engineering to computer science and beyond.	ISSN 2691-3399 (web)
PRX Life	PRX Life	Margaret Gardel; Serena Bradde		2022–present	PRX Life will publish outstanding research at all scales of biological organization, including a focus on quantitative biological research.	(web)
Reviews of Modern Physics	Rev. Mod. Phys.	Randall Kamien; Debbie Brodbar	48.9	1929–present	The full range of applied, fundamental, and interdisciplinary physics research topics	ISSN 0034-6861 (print); ISSN 1539-0756 (web)
Physical Review A (Note: Volumes 133–140 of the Series II in years 1964 and 1965 were split into issues A and B. Later they were unified into a single series again. They are different from Phys. Rev. A and B of the third series. For example "Phys. Rev. 133 A1 (1964)" is an article of Ser. II, while "Phys. Rev. A 1 1 (1970) is of Phys. Rev. A.)	Phys. Rev. A	Jan Michael Rost; Thomas Pattard	3.0	1970–present	Atomic, molecular, and optical physics, foundations of quantum mechanics and quantum information	ISSN 1050-2947 (print); ISSN 1094-1622 (web)
Physical Review B	Phys. Rev. B	Stephen Nagler; Sarma Kancharla	3.9	1970–present	The full range of condensed matter, materials physics, and related subfields	ISSN 1098-0121 (print); ISSN 1550-235X (web)
Physical Review C	Phys. Rev. C	Joseph I. Kapusta; Christopher Wesselborg	3.3	1970–present	Experimental and theoretical results in all aspects of nuclear physics	ISSN 0556-2813 (print); ISSN 1089-490X (web)
Physical Review D	Phys. Rev. D	Mirjam Cvetič; Urs M. Heller	5.3	1970–present	Experimental and theoretical results in all aspects of particle physics, field theory, gravitation, and cosmology	ISSN 1550-7998 (print); ISSN 1550-2368 (web)
Physical Review E	Phys. Rev. E	Uwe C. Täuber; Dario Corradini	2.5	1993–present	Statistical, nonlinear, biological and soft matter physics	ISSN 1539-3755 (print); ISSN 1550-2376 (web)
Physical Review Research	Phys. Rev. Res.	Nicola Spaldin; Raissa D’Souza; Juan-José Liétor-Santos	4.0	2019–present	All research topics of interest to the physics community	ISSN 2643-1564 (web)
Physical Review Accelerators and Beams	Phys. Rev. Accel. Beams	Frank Zimmermann; Debbie Brodbar	2.0	1998–present	All topics in accelerator science, applications, and technology	ISSN 2469-9888 (web)
Physical Review Applied	Phys. Rev. Appl.	Stephen R. Forrest; Matthew Eager; Jelena Vučković	4.4	2014–present	All aspects of experimental and theoretical applications of physics	ISSN 2331-7019 (web)
Physical Review Fluids	Phys. Rev. Fluids	Eric Lauga; Beverley McKeon; Bradley Rubin	3.0	2016–present	All aspects of fluid dynamics research	ISSN 2469-990X (web)
Physical Review Materials	Phys. Rev. Mater.	Chris Leighton; Hari Dahal	3.6	2017–present	Wide range of topics on materials research	ISSN 2475-9953 (web)
Physical Review Physics Education Research	Phys. Rev. Phys. Educ. Res.	Charles Henderson; Debbie Brodbar	3.5	2005–present	Experimental and theoretical physics education research	ISSN 2469-9896 (web)
Physics	Physics	Matteo Rini		2008–present	All of Physics	ISSN 1943-2879 (web)
Physical Review, Series I	Phys. Rev.			1893–1912	All of Physics	
Physical Review, Series II	Phys. Rev.			1913–1969	All of Physics	
Physics Physique Физика (Note: Perhaps most noteworthy for publishing Bell's theorem in 1964.)		Philip Warren Anderson; B. T. Matthias		1964–1968		

== See also ==
- List of fluid mechanics journals
