= Jenny Rosenthal Bramley =

Russian-born American physicist 1909–1997)

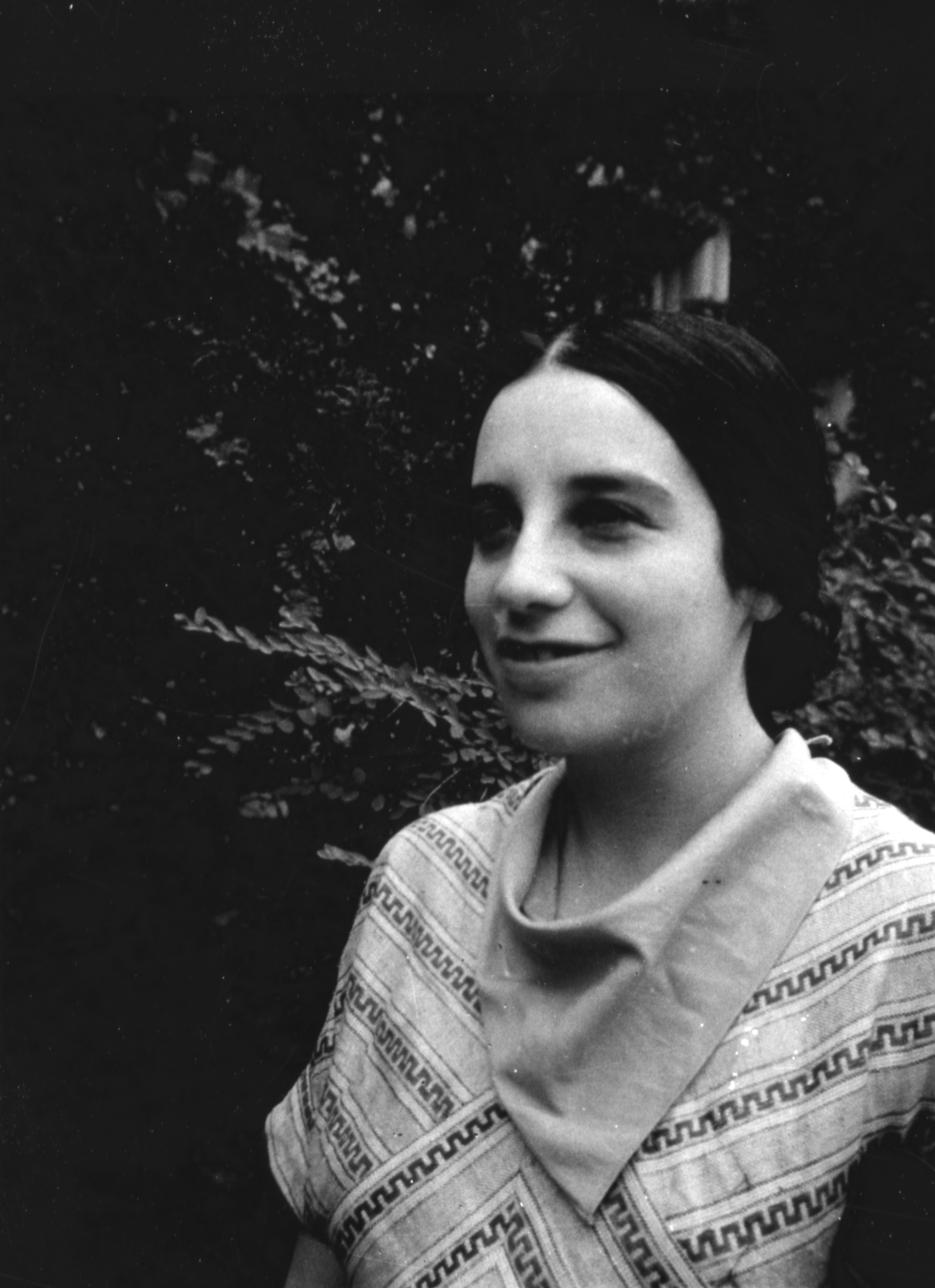
- Born: July 31, 1909; Moscow, Russia
- Died: May 26, 1997 (aged 87); Lancaster, Pennsylvania, United States
- Known for: First woman to earn Ph.D in physics from an American institution
- Scientific career
- Fields: Physics

Jenny Rosenthal Bramley (July 31, 1909 – May 26, 1997) was a Russian-born American physicist. She held numerous patents on electroluminescence and electro-optics, and was cited by the IEEE as being "well known for her innovative work in lasers." She was the second woman elected as a fellow of the IEEE.

== Personal life ==
Bramley was born Jenny Rosenthal in Moscow on July 31, 1909. Her parents were Litvak, and she and her family left Russia as part of a hostage exchange between Lithuania and the Soviet Union. She attended high school in Berlin and earned her bachelor's degree from the University of Paris in 1926 at age 16.

She spoke English, Russian, French, and German, and she used her language skills many times at professional meetings and to translate technical articles.

Bramley received both a master's degree in 1927 and a doctorate in 1929 at age 19 from New York University (NYU). University officials at NYU claim she became the first woman to receive a Ph.D. in physics from an American institution. However, three women (Mary Chilton Noyes, Caroline Willard Baldwin, and Isabelle Stone) were awarded doctorates in physics from American institutions in the nineteenth century, and evidence suggests at least 26 women earned doctorates in physics before 1929.

Bramley met her husband, Arthur Bramley, while working as a physicist at the United States Army Signal Corps Engineering Laboratory in Belmar, NJ. She died on May 26, 1997, at age 87 in Lancaster, PA, and was survived by a daughter, son, eleven grandchildren, and one great-granddaughter. She was preceded in death by her husband and one son.

== Career ==
After graduating from New York University Bramley did research at Johns Hopkins University and the University of Michigan before teaching at Brooklyn College and New York University.

Along with Gregory Breit, Bramley was the first to calculate the effect of extended nuclear charge on hyperfine structure and isotopic shift – an effect still known as the Breit–Rosenthal correction. She contributed to a number of other fields including applying electroluminescence to solid state displays and storage devices and developing high efficiency lasers. Bramley also invented coding techniques and methods of decoding pictorial information, later used in classified studies.

During World War II Bramley conducted some research in secret which she was unable to publish at the time. In the 1950s she worked at Monmouth Junior College, where she served as head of the mathematics department.

== Honors and awards ==
- Sarah Berliner Research Fellow, American Association of University Women
- Fellow, American Physical Society
- Fellow, Institute of Electrical & Electronics Engineers
- Wise Lifetime Achievement Award 1985, The InterAgency Committee on Women in Science and Engineering; cited as the most outstanding woman scientist in the federal government.
- Fellow, Washington Academy of Science

== Legacy ==
In 1997, New York University named a physics laboratory in honor of Bramley.
