= List of fluid mechanics journals =

This is a list of scientific journals related to the field of fluid mechanics.

- AIAA Journal
- Annual Review of Fluid Mechanics
- Experiments in Fluids
- Fluid Dynamics
- Fluid Dynamics Research
- Flow, Turbulence and Combustion
- International Journal for Numerical Methods in Fluids
- International Journal of Multiphase Flow
- Journal of Aircraft
- Journal of Chemical Physics
- Journal of Computational Physics
- Journal of Experiments in Fluid Mechanics
- Journal of Fluid Mechanics
- Journal of Physics A
- Journal of the Physical Society of Japan
- Magnetohydrodynamics
- Physica A
- Physical Review E
- Physical Review Fluids
- Physics of Fluids
- The Quarterly Journal of Mechanics and Applied Mathematics

== See also ==
- List of scientific journals
- List of physics journals
- List of materials science journals
