= Physical Review B =

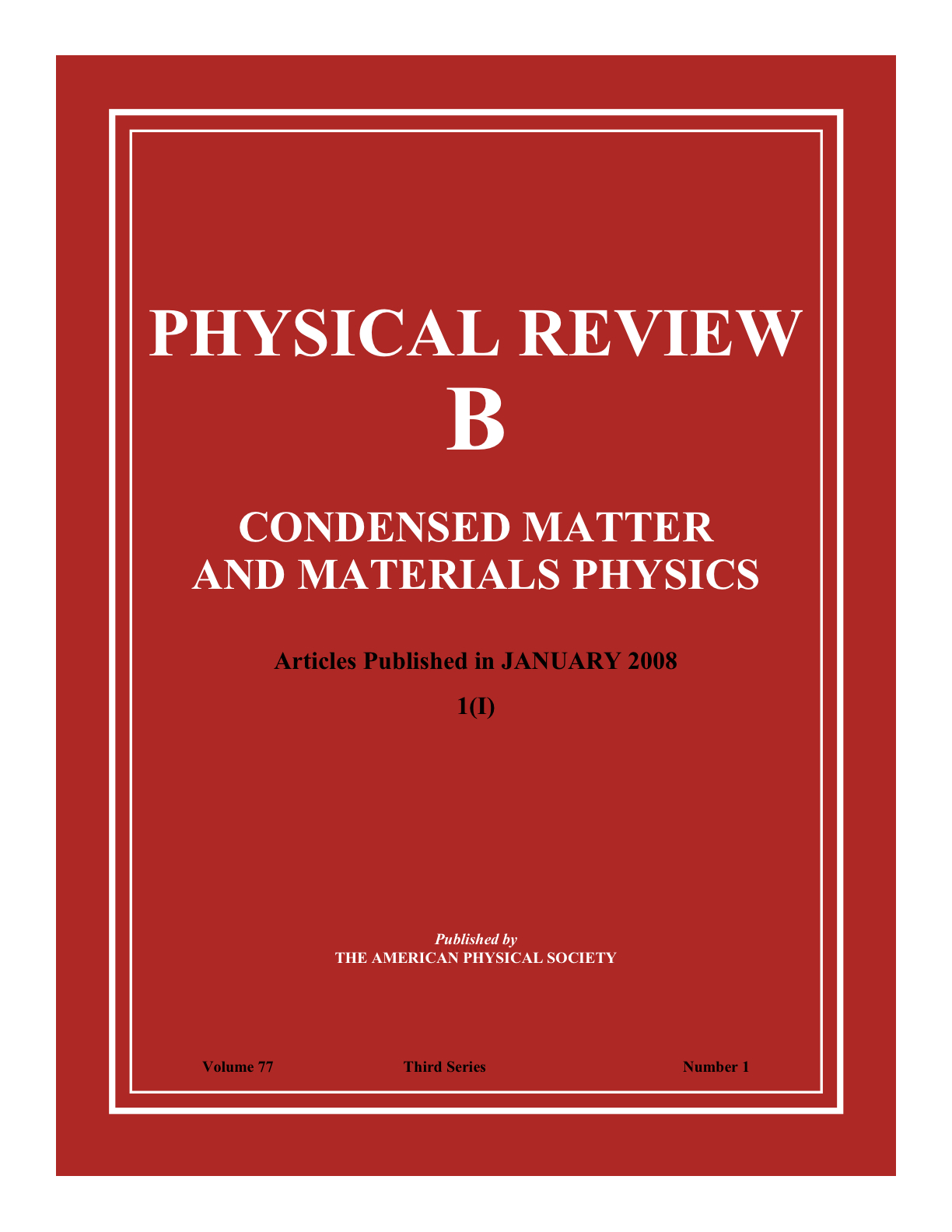
- Discipline: condensed matter physics materials physics
- Language: English
- Edited by: Stephen E. Nagler, Sarma Kancharla

Publication details
- Former names: Physical Review, Physical Review B: Condensed Matter Physics
- History: 1970 to present
- Publisher: American Physical Society (United States)
- Frequency: 4 issues per month
- Open access: Partial
- Impact factor: 3.7 (2024)

Standard abbreviations
- ISO 4: Phys. Rev. B

Indexing
- CODEN: PRBMDO
- ISSN: 2469-9950 (print); 2469-9969 (web)

Links
- Journal homepage; Archives

Physical Review B: Condensed Matter and Materials Physics (also known as PRB) is a peer-reviewed, scientific journal, published by the American Physical Society (APS). The Lead Editor of PRB is Stephen E. Nagler and the Chief Editor is Sarma Kancharla. It is part of the Physical Review family of journals. The current Editor in Chief is Randall Kamien. PRB currently publishes over 5000 papers a year, making it one of the largest physics journals in the world.

== Scope ==
The focus of this journal is on new results in condensed matter physics, which includes a wide variety of subject areas, such as semiconductors, superconductivity, magnetism, structure, phase transitions, ferroelectrics, nonordered systems, liquids, quantum solids, superfluidity, electronic structure, photonic crystals, mesoscopic systems, surfaces, clusters, fullerenes, graphene, nanoscience, etc.

== History ==
PRB was created in 1970 when the original Physical Review (founded in 1893) was subdivided into Physical Review A, B, C, and D, based on subject matter. Peter D. Adams was the Editor from inception until 2012 when Laurens W. Molenkamp took over. In 2023 Stephen E. Nagler replaced Molenkamp as the Lead Editor. Sarma Kancharla is currently the Chief Editor.

== Features ==
PRB has a reputation among professional physicists for publishing useful, comprehensive long papers in physics. It also contains short (four page) papers in its Letters section, previously named Rapid Communications, designed for research important enough to deserve special handling and speedy publication. The journal can be searched for free via PROLA. Titles and abstracts can be freely viewed but a journal subscription is needed to read the full text of papers. PRB and the other APS journals are available entirely free at many US public libraries.

PRB has a staff of 11 full-time professional editors, and 7 part-time editors who are active researchers. The journal is available in print format (at University libraries) but the archival version is the online one. Authors can pay extra charges to make their papers open access. Such papers are published under the terms of the Creative Commons Attribution 3.0 License (CC-BY), the most permissive of the CC licenses, which permits authors and others to copy, distribute, transmit, and adapt the work, provided that proper credit is given. A small percentage of the PRB papers published are chosen (highlighted) as an Editors' Suggestions. Artistic images from papers in the journal are published as a feature named Kaleidoscope.

== Abstracting and Indexing ==
Physical Review B is indexed in the following bibliographic databases:

- Chemical Abstracts
- Computer & Control Abstracts
- Current Physics Index
- Electrical & Electronics Index
- Energy Research Abstracts
- INSPEC
- Mathematical Reviews
- Metals Abstracts
- Physics Abstracts
- PubSCIENCE
- SPIN

== See also ==
- American Physical Society § APS journals
- Physical Review § Journals
