= Geophysical Research Letters =

Biweekly peer-reviewed scientific journal

- Discipline: Geophysics, Earth science, space science
- Language: English
- Edited by: Kristopher Karnauskas

Publication details
- History: 1974—present
- Publisher: American Geophysical Union (United States)
- Frequency: Biweekly
- Open access: Yes (Gold Open Access)
- Impact factor: 5.58 (2021)

Standard abbreviations
- ISO 4: Geophys. Res. Lett.

Indexing
- CODEN: GPRLAJ
- ISSN: 0094-8276 (print); 1944-8007 (web)
- LCCN: 74646541
- OCLC no.: 1795290

Links
- Journal homepage; Online access; Online archive

Geophysical Research Letters is a biweekly open-access peer-reviewed scientific journal of geoscience published by the American Geophysical Union that was established in 1974. The editor-in-chief is Kristopher Karnauskas.

== Aims and scope ==
The journal aims for rapid publication of concise research reports on one or more of the disciplines covered by the American Geophysical Union, such as atmospheric sciences, solid Earth, space science, oceanography, hydrology, land surface processes, and the cryosphere. The journal also publishes invited reviews that cover advances achieved during the past two or three years. The target readership is the earth science community, the broader scientific community, and the general public.

== Abstracting and indexing ==
This journal is abstracted and indexed in:

- SPIN
- Computer & Control Abstracts
- Electrical & Electronics Abstracts
- Physics Abstracts. Science Abstracts. Series A
- Electronics and Communications Abstracts
- ISMEC Bulletin
- Pollution Abstracts
- Safety Science Abstracts Journal
- Life Sciences Collection
- Excerpta Medica
- Coal Abstracts
- International Aerospace Abstracts
- GeoRef
- Chemical Abstracts
- GEOBASE
- Energy Research Abstracts
- Scopus
- PubMed
- Science Citation Index Expanded

According to the 2020 Journal Citation Reports, the journal has a 2019 impact factor of 4.58. Geophysical Research Letters was also the 5th most cited publication on climate change between 1999 and 2009.

== See also ==
- List of scientific journals in earth and atmospheric sciences
