= Physical Review Focus =

- Discipline: Physics
- Language: English
- Edited by: David Ehrenstein

Publication details
- History: 1998–present
- Publisher: American Physical Society (United States)
- Frequency: Weekly
- Open access: Yes

Standard abbreviations
- ISO 4: Phys. Rev. Focus

Indexing
- CODEN: PRFHAQ
- ISSN: 1539-0748

Links
- Journal homepage

Physical Review Focus was an internet service of the American Physical Society that began in 1998, aiming to explain new developments in physics in a language understandable to the educated non-physicist. One or two short articles were published weekly. In 2011, it merged with the magazine Physics (physics.aps.org) and became the Focus section of that publication. The Focus section of Physics continues to produce the same style of articles that were previously published in Physical Review Focus.

The content is available without payment.

The name came from the service's connection to the Physical Review, a suite of scientific journals published by the American Physical Society.
