= Jürgen Schmitt =

Jürgen Schmitt may refer to:

- Jürgen Schmitt (artist), German painter, photographer, composer, lyricist and Schlager-singer
- Jürgen Schmitt (physicist), German astronomer and physicist

== See also ==
- Jürgen Schmidt, German speed skater
