= Mary Chilton Noyes =

Physicist

- Born: January 13, 1855
- Died: September 13, 1936 (aged 81); California
- Education: University of Iowa, Ph.B. 1881, A.M. 1884; Cornell University, M.S. 1894; Western Reserve University, PhD 1895
- Scientific career
- Workplaces: Lake Erie College; Minneapolis Academy
- Thesis: The Influence of Heat and the Electric Current upon Young's Modulus for a Piano Wire (1895)

Mary Chilton Noyes (January 13, 1855 – September 13, 1936) was an American physicist known for being the first woman to earn a PhD from Western Reserve University and one of the first women to earn a PhD in physics from a United States institution.

== Career ==
Mary Chilton Noyes was born on January 13, 1855. She attended the University of Iowa, earning a Ph.B. in 1881 and an A.M. in 1884. Noyes subsequently attended Cornell University, where she earned an M.S. in 1894.

Noyes then earned a PhD in 1895 at Western Reserve University, only three years after the institution had begun awarding graduate degrees. The graduate school officially became open to students in 1894, and opened with no exclusions on the basis of sex. Western Reserve University had also just opened their College for Women in 1888, promoting a college with all of the same educational privileges bestowed upon men. She was thus the first woman to earn a graduate degree from Western Reserve University. Noyes published her thesis, entitled "The Influence of Heat and the Electric Current upon Young's Modulus for a Piano Wire," in Physical Review. Noyes was one of the first three women (along with Mary Crehore and Mary Spencer), to publish in Physical Review, all of whom worked under Edward Leamington Nichols.

Noyes's doctoral degree was also one of the first awarded in physics to a woman by a United States institution. She was awarded her degree the same year as Caroline Willard Baldwin, who earned her degree in 1895 from Cornell University. That same year another American woman, Margaret Eliza Maltby, also earned her doctorate, but from the University of Göttingen. This achievement was quickly followed by Isabelle Stone, who earned a PhD in physics from the University of Chicago in 1897.

Noyes spent most of her career at Lake Erie College, where she worked from 1886 to 1900 and taught mathematics, physics, and astronomy. From 1900 until her retirement she worked at the Minneapolis Academy, again teaching mathematics, physics, and astronomy. She retired to Pasadena, California, and died in 1936.
