= Optics Letters =

- Discipline: Optics
- Language: English
- Edited by: Carsten Rockstuhl

Publication details
- History: 1977–present
- Publisher: Optica
- Frequency: Biweekly
- Open access: Hybrid
- Impact factor: 3.3 (2025)

Standard abbreviations
- ISO 4: Opt. Lett.

Indexing
- CODEN: OPLEDP
- ISSN: 0146-9592 (print); 1539-4794 (web)
- LCCN: 77643072
- OCLC no.: 3058079

Links
- Journal homepage; Online access; Online archives

Optics Letters is a biweekly peer-reviewed scientific journal published by Optica (formerly known as Optical Society of America). It was established in July 1977. The editor-in-chief is Carsten Rockstuhl (Karlsruhe Institute of Technology). The journal covers all topics pertaining to optics and photonics. Publishing formats are short and rapid communications, with articles being limited to four journal pages.

== Abstracting and indexing ==
The journal is abstracted and indexed in:

- Science Citation Index Expanded
- Current Contents/Physical, Chemical & Earth Sciences
- Current Contents/Engineering, Computing & Technology
- Computer & Control Abstracts
- Electrical & Electronics Abstracts
- Physics Abstracts - Series A: Science Abstracts
- SPIN bibliographic database
- Chemical Abstracts Service
- Current Physics Index
- Energy Citations Database
- Embase
- International Aerospace Abstracts

According to the Journal Citation Reports, the journal has a 2025 impact factor of 3.3.
