= Martin Blume =

American physicist (1932–2021)

- Born: January 13, 1932; New York City, U.S.
- Died: October 6, 2021 (aged 89)
- Education: Princeton University; Harvard University
- Scientific career
- Workplaces: Brookhaven National Laboratory; Stony Brook University; Physical Review

Martin "Marty" Blume (January 13, 1932 – October 6, 2021) was an American physicist and editor-in-chief of the American Physical Society.

== Early life ==
Martin Blume attended Abraham Lincoln High School in Brooklyn and studied physics at Princeton University. He transferred to Harvard University for his master's degree, where he also received his doctorate in theoretical physics in 1959.

== Career ==
After a research stay as a Fulbright Research Fellow at the University of Tokyo, he joined the Atomic Energy Research Establishment in Harwell, UK, as a research scientist in 1960. In 1962, he moved to Brookhaven National Laboratory in Upton, where he conducted research for over 30 years and served as deputy director from 1984 to 1996. At the same time, he was a professor of physics at the Stony Brook University from 1972 to 1980. From 1997 to 2007, he was editor-in-chief of the American Physical Society's Physical Review series of journals. As editor-in-chief he was responsible, among other things, for converting the Physical Review journal series to digital editions.

== Research ==
As a theoretical physicist, Martin Blume worked on neutron scattering, magnetism, magnetic resonance, and synchrotron radiation, among other things. He also played a leading role in establishing the National Synchrotron Light Source (NSLS) at Brookhaven National Laboratory, a facility that became an essential foundation for solid-state physics and materials science there.

== Personal life ==
He was married to Sheila B. Blume (née Bierman) and was the father of two children, Frederick and Janet. In his private life, he was interested in opera and classical music.

== Awards and honors ==
- 1954: Shuichi Kusaka Memorial Prize in Physics
- 1981: Ernest-Orlando-Lawrence-Award
- 1984: Member of the American Association for the Advancement of Science (AAAS)
- 1993: Fellow of the American Academy of Arts and Sciences
- 2003: Arthur H. Compton Award
- 2005: Meritorious Achievement Award des Council of Science Editors
