= Margaret Eliza Maltby =

American physicist (1860–1944)

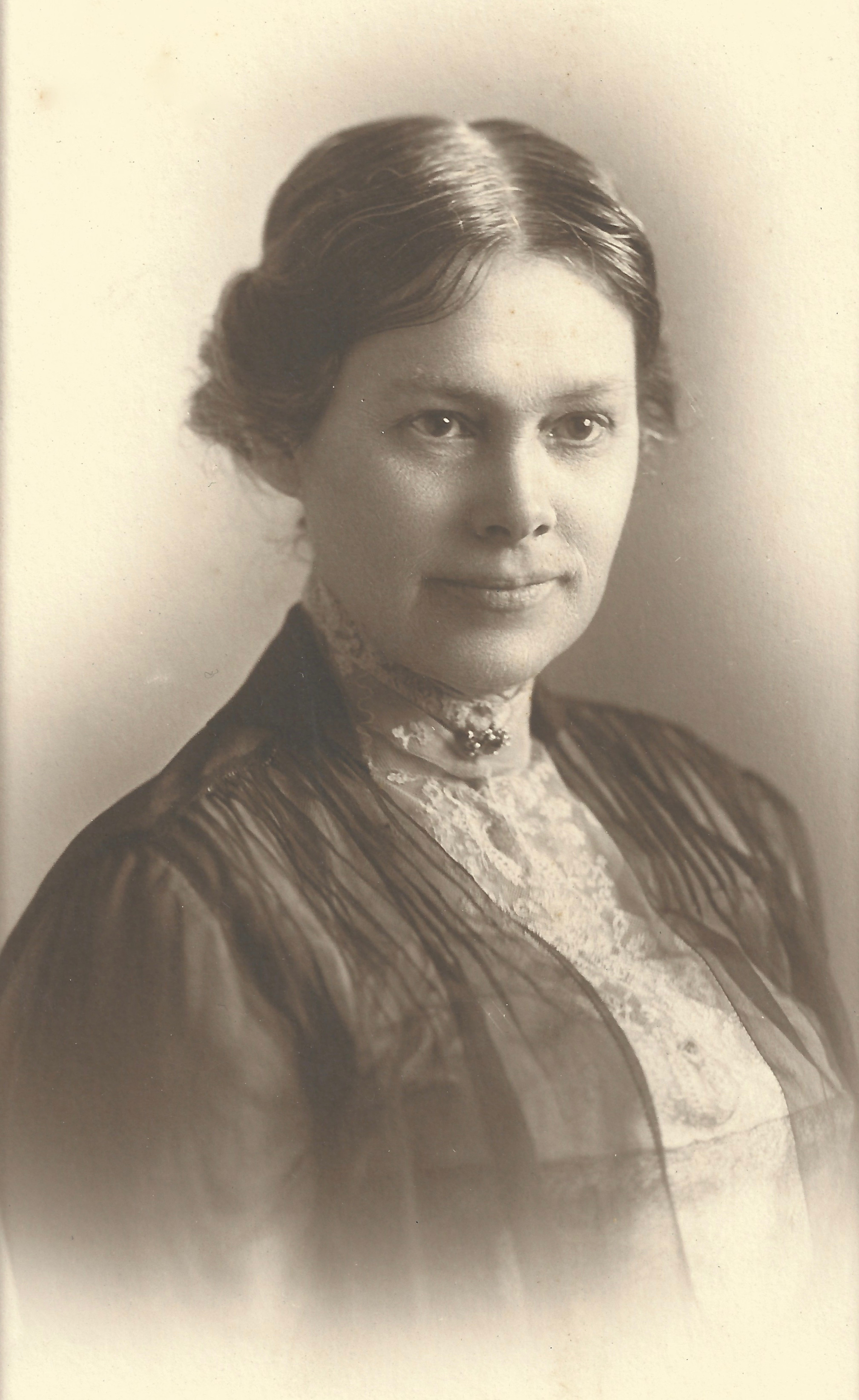
- Maltby, c. 1908
- Born: December 10, 1860; Bristolville, Ohio
- Died: May 3, 1944 (aged 83); New York City
- Education: Oberlin College, A.B. 1882, A.M. 1891 Massachusetts Institute of Technology B.S. 1891 University of Göttingen, Ph.D. 1895
- Known for: Measurement of high electrolytic resistances and of the conductivity of very dilute solutions.
- Children: 1
- Scientific career
- Fields: Physics
- Workplaces: Wellesley College; University of Göttingen; Lake Erie College; Physikalisch-Technische Reichsanstalt; Barnard College
- Thesis: Methode zur Bestimmung grosser elektrolytischer Widerstände (1895)
- Doctoral advisor: Walther Nernst
- Other academic advisors: Friedrich Kohlrausch; Arthur Webster

Margaret Eliza Maltby (December 10, 1860 – May 3, 1944) was an American physicist notable for her measurement of high electrolytic resistances and the conductivity of very dilute solutions. Maltby was the first woman to earn a Bachelor of Science degree from the Massachusetts Institute of Technology, and the first woman to earn a Ph.D. in physics from any German university.

She taught for over 30 years at Barnard College where she introduced one of the first courses on the physics of music. Maltby was active in the American Association of University Women where she was instrumental in helping female academics receive fellowships to study and conduct research, at a time when it was uncommon for women to be eligible for such fellowships.

Maltby had a child out of wedlock. Unusually for her time, she was able to continue her career in academia by keeping the birth a secret and later claiming the child publicly through adoption.

== Early life ==
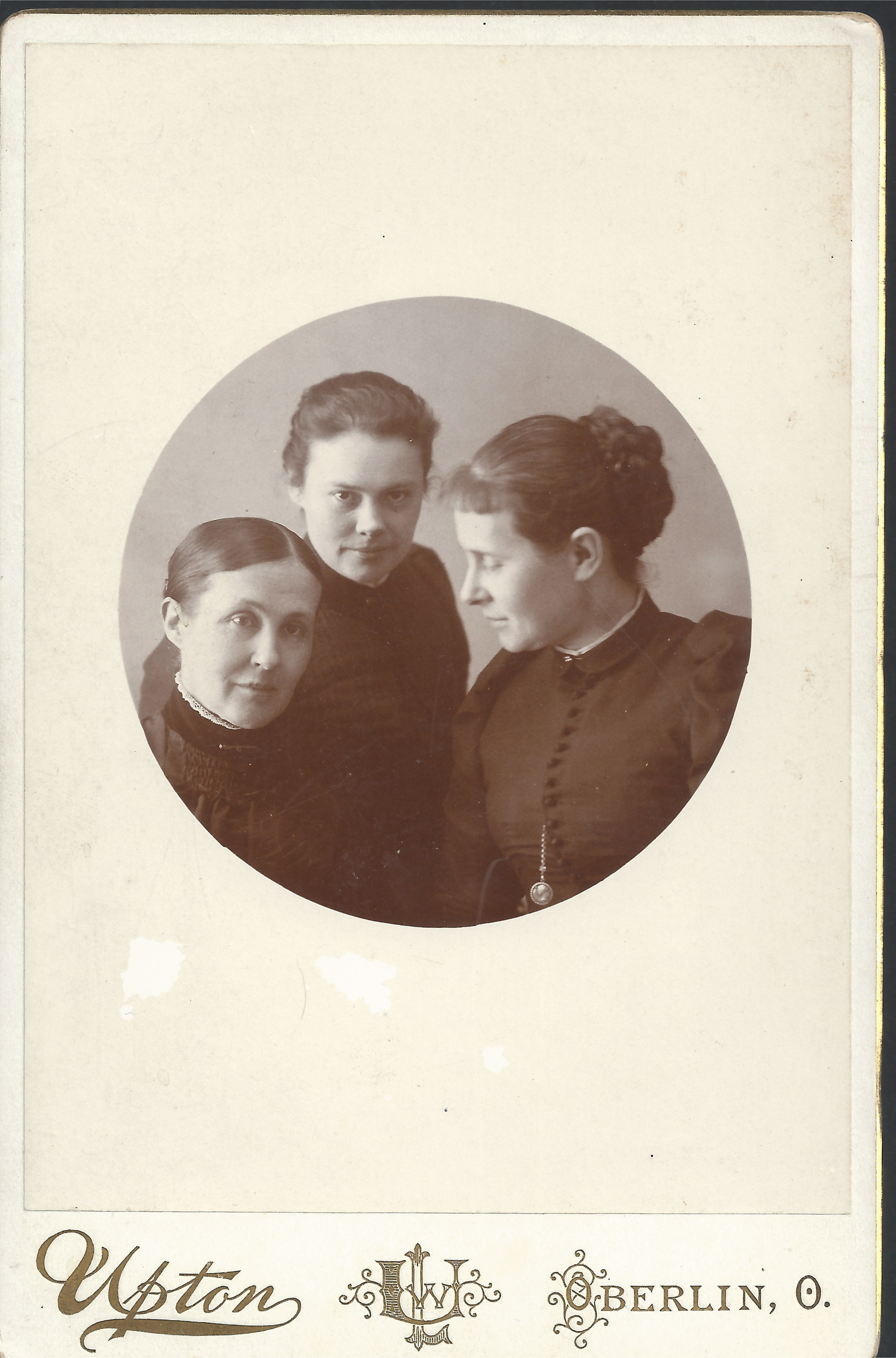
Margaret Maltby (center) with her sisters Betsy (Maltby) Mayhew and Martha Jane Maltby, 1892

Margaret Maltby was born Minnie Eliza Maltby on her family's farm in Bristolville, Ohio, on December 10, 1860, to Edmund Maltby and Lydia Jane Brockway. She had two older sisters: Betsy (Maltby) Mayhew and Martha Jane Maltby who were 15 and 13, respectively, at the time of her birth. Minnie Maltby was named by her sisters, but she disliked the name and later changed it to Margaret in 1889.

Maltby was interested in science and mathematics at a young age, and her parents encouraged those interests. They taught her how to use basic machinery, and her father especially supported her interest in mathematics. After Edmund Maltby's death, the Maltby family moved to Oberlin, Ohio for educational opportunities.

== Education ==
Maltby attended the preparatory school at Oberlin College before matriculating there in 1878. She graduated from Oberlin in 1882. During college she explored her interest in music. Music became a lifelong interest of hers both personally and in her professional work. In adulthood she listened frequently to classical music on the radio at her home and developed one of the first academic courses about the physics of music during her tenure at Barnard College. Following college Maltby studied at the Art Students League of New York and taught high school in Ohio for four years.

In 1887, Maltby enrolled at the Massachusetts Institute of Technology (MIT) and went on to earn a B.S. degree in 1891. She had to enroll as a "special" student because the institution did not accept female students. She met Ellen Swallow Richards in 1887 and joined her "Women's Laboratory" at MIT. Maltby formed a life-long friendship with Richards, and later spoke at her memorial of her "constant thoughtfulness" towards female students as the only female teacher at MIT.

Maltby was the first woman to earn a B.S. degree from MIT, and for this achievement Oberlin College awarded her an honorary A.M. in 1891. While at MIT, Maltby conducted research on acoustics with Charles R. Cross on the minimum number of vibrations necessary to determine a difference in frequency between two sounds. Their research was in response to work by Félix Savart and Friedrich Kohlrausch who had argued that at least two cycles of a sound wave were required. Maltby and Cross's work, published in 1892, showed that less than a cycle was necessary to distinguish a C3 tuning fork from a C4 tuning fork, which are an octave different in pitch.

In 1893 Maltby enrolled at the University of Göttingen, one of the first three women to do so. The other two women, who also entered in that same year, were Grace Chisholm Young and Mary Frances Winston Newson. Maltby was able to attend the university through a European Fellowship from the Association of Collegiate Alumnae. This fellowship, created largely through the efforts of Christine Ladd-Franklin, was intended to pressure foreign universities to open their doors to female students on a regular basis. In 1895 Maltby received her Ph.D., becoming the first woman to receive a Ph.D. in physics from the University of Göttingen and the first woman to obtain a Ph.D. in physics from any German university. For her doctoral work Maltby studied under Walther Nernst in his physical chemistry laboratory. Nernst was interested in the theory of ionic dissociation and early research into this topic had focused on solutions that were relatively good conductors. In her dissertation Maltby studied solvents that were poor conductors, including alcohol, ether, and water. She applied a Wheatstone bridge in a novel way to measure the conductivity in electrolytically resistant substances.

== Career ==
After she received her doctorate she worked at the newly founded Institut für Physikalische Chemie at Göttingen under Nernst.

When she returned from Germany in 1896, Maltby took up a position as associate professor at Wellesley College where she substituted for Sarah Frances Whiting who was on sabbatical. Maltby had previously taught at Wellesley as an instructor in physics from 1889 to 1893 to earn some money while attending MIT. At the end of the fall 1896 term, Maltby suddenly resigned for what she claimed at the time was to recuperate from a serious accident. Maltby resumed her teaching career as an instructor at Lake Erie College in September 1897 where she substituted for Mary Chilton Noyes.

Invited back to Germany in 1898 to work at the Physikalisch-Technische Reichsanstalt in Charlottenburg, Maltby worked as a research assistant to Friedrich Kohlrausch on electrolytic conductivity in solutions. Based on their data, Kohlrausch proposed the non-linear law for strong electrolytes. After returning to the United States, Maltby studied mathematical physics with Arthur Webster at Clark University from 1899 to 1900.

In 1900 Maltby took up a position as an instructor in chemistry at Barnard College, hoping that an opportunity would soon open up for her to teach physics. In 1903 Marie Reimer was hired as the head chemistry instructor and Maltby transferred to physics. Maltby's involvement in administration and building up the physics department left her little time for research, although she spent a sabbatical year from 1909–1910 at the Cavendish Laboratory. Maltby held positions at Barnard as an adjunct professor of physics (1903–1910), assistant professor (1910–1913), and associate professor and chair (1913–1931). While at Barnard, Maltby took an active role in college life, including participating in student groups, judging contests, and hosting afternoon teas for the faculty. She also introduced one of the first courses in the physics of music.

Physicist and historian of science Katherine Sopka wrote that her students greatly admired her. One wrote to Sopka that: "Professor Maltby was my mentor—a gracious lady—a friend and a counselor. Her most memorable advice to me was not to forego marriage for a career—which I followed and lived happily ever after." Although Maltby supported the ability of other female academics to marry, she personally did not believe that marriage would be beneficial between two scientists. She wrote to Svante Arrhenius on the occasion of his divorce that she believed that it was inevitable that one personality would subsume the other in a marriage of two scientists, and so she herself never wanted to get married.

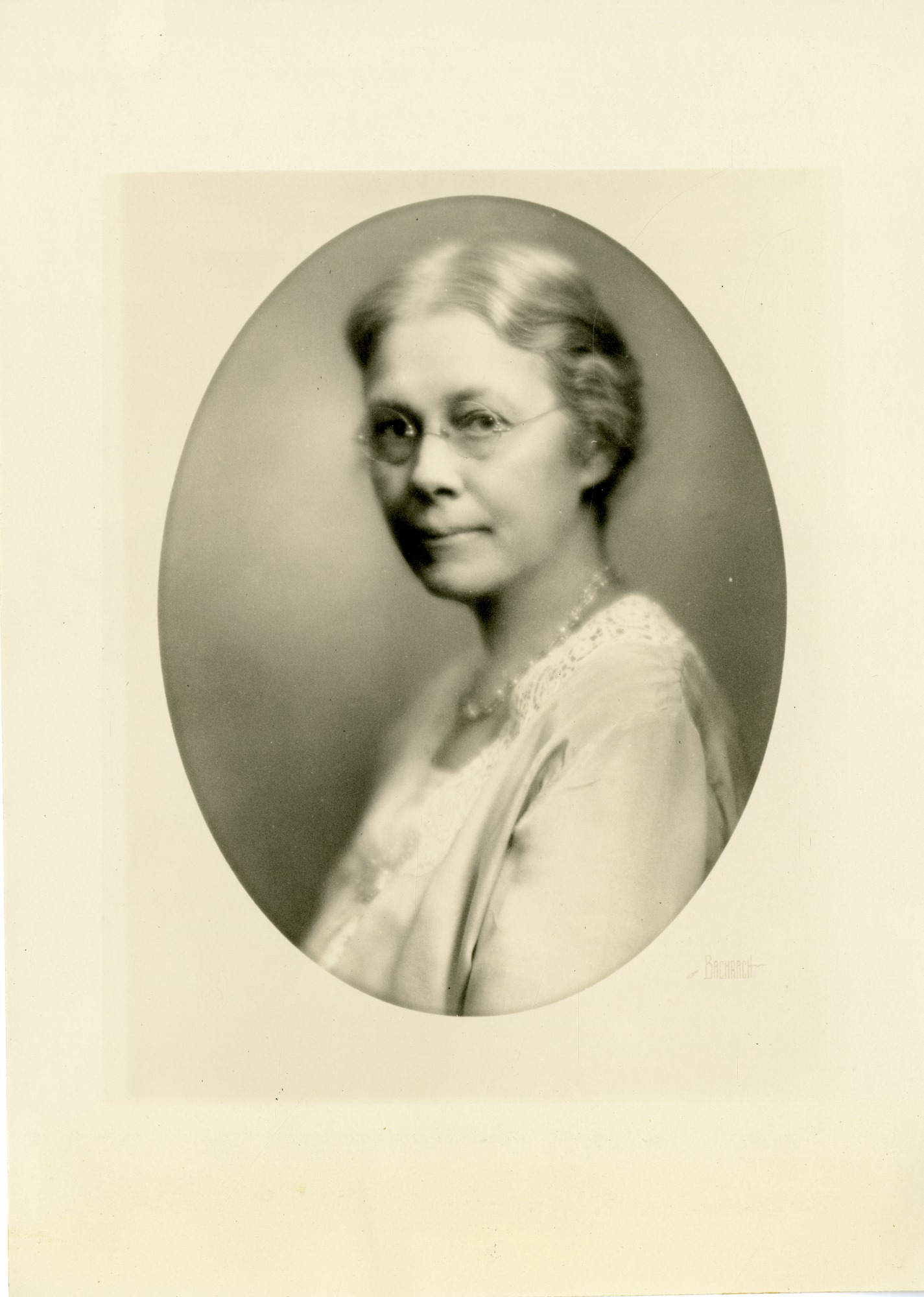
Maltby at the time of her retirement

In the summer of 1906, while Maltby was chair of the physics department, Harriet Brooks announced that she planned to marry. Although Brooks assumed she would be able to keep her position, Laura Gill, the Dean of Barnard College at the time, was strongly opposed. In the early 1900s it was very common for female academics to leave their employment at women's colleges upon marriage. Maltby spoke up on behalf of Brooks, arguing to Gill that Brooks was a talented teacher and researcher and would be able to keep up with her duties. However, Maltby was not able to convince Gill, and Brooks left the college later that year. Gill argued to Maltby that marriage would be too great a drain on a female professor's time, despite knowing that Maltby had adopted a child. Gill likely viewed marriage as a form of disloyalty by a female instructor to the college, in contrast to motherhood which was an approved role.

Maltby volunteered with the American Association of University Women (AAUW), working especially on behalf of the Committee on Fellowships. As a member, and chair, of the committee, Maltby distributed fellowships to women to enable them to conduct research. At that time, women were not eligible for many other grants or fellowships due to their gender, so the AAUW Fellowships were an important support for female academics in the United States. In recognition of her work, the Margaret E. Maltby Fellowship was established by the American Association of University Women in 1926. In 1929 Maltby wrote a history of the first forty years of fellowships administered by the AAUW.

The first edition of American Men of Science (AMS), published in 1906, recognized Maltby's name with a star. A star indicated that the individual was one of the country's top scientists. Maltby's listing was recognized with a star in the following six editions of the AMS as well. Maltby was a fellow of the American Physical Society. In 1960 she was profiled in the American Journal of Physics to mark the occasion of the 100th anniversary of her birth.

== Personal life ==
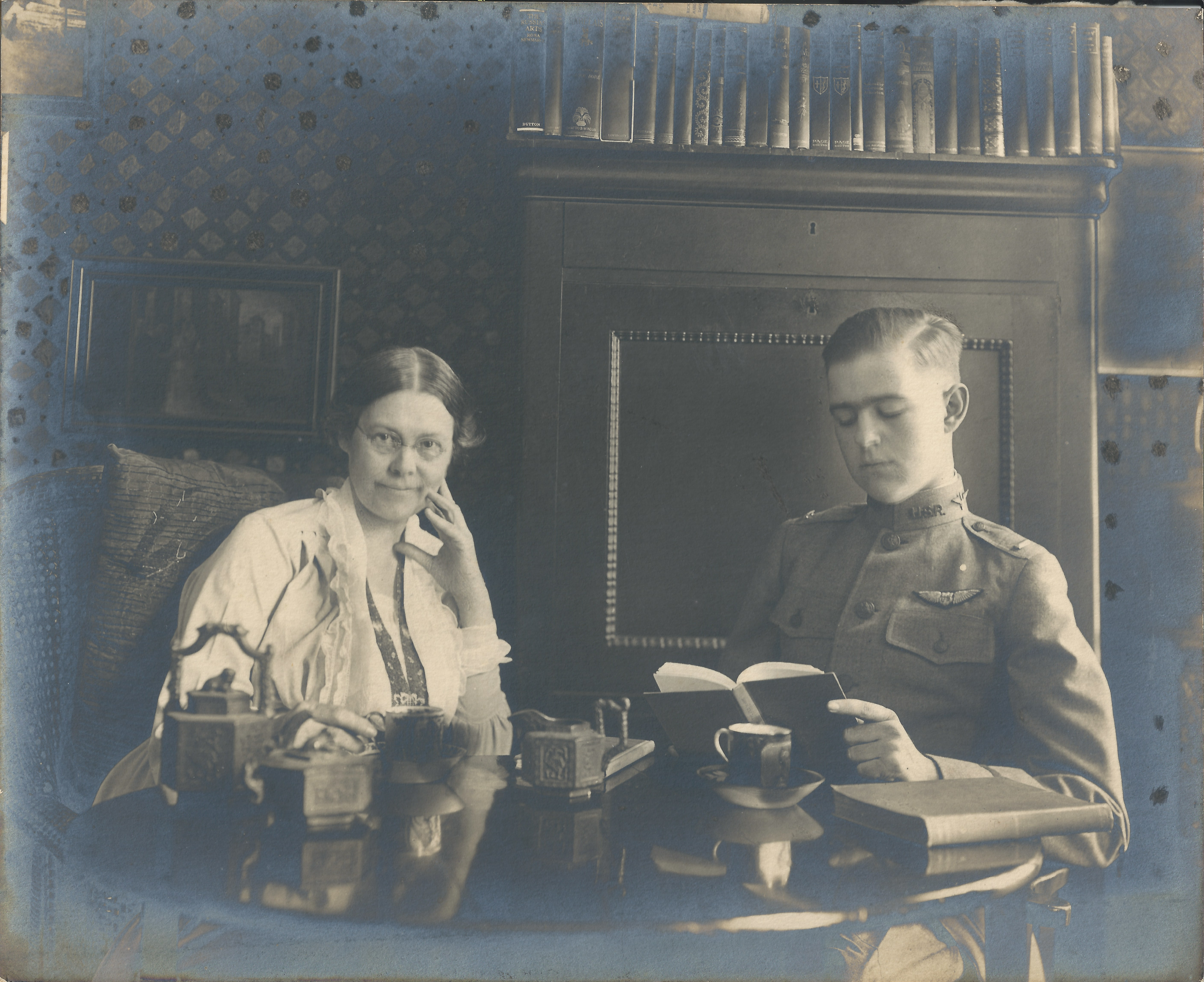
Maltby with her son Philip Randolph Meyer, home from flight training at Kelly Field, circa 1918

In 1901 Maltby adopted a boy, Philip Randolph Meyer, who she claimed was the orphaned son of a close friend. This claim was accepted throughout both Maltby's and Meyer's lives. In 2014, Autosomal DNA tests of Meyer's two daughters through Ancestry.com showed strong links to known descendants of Maltby's mother and of her father. The results of the tests indicated that Philip Randolph Meyer was Maltby's natural son. He was born in June 1897, six months after Maltby's sudden resignation from Wellesley College. Maltby likely resigned to hide her pregnancy and preserve her career. When Maltby returned to a research position in Germany in 1898, she left her son in the care of a friend who had a nursery. Upon taking up a post at Barnard College, Maltby reunited with Meyer.

In her leisure time, Maltby enjoyed listening to music, especially the Metropolitan Opera, and travel. She also enjoyed spending time with Meyer's children (her grandchildren) who were born in the 1930s. In her later years Maltby suffered from arthritis. Maltby died on May 3, 1944, at the Columbia-Presbyterian Medical Center in New York City. After her death, Meyer burned Maltby's personal papers as she had requested that he do. It has been speculated that this was to protect her public or private reputation.

== Selected publications ==
=== Scientific publications ===
- Cross, Charles R.; Maltby, Margaret E. (1892). "On the Least Number of Vibrations Necessary to Determine Pitch". Proceedings of the American Academy of Arts and Sciences. 27: 222–235. doi:10.2307/20020475. hdl:1721.1/148750. JSTOR 20020475.
- Maltby, Margaret (1895). "Methode zur Bestimmung grosser elektrolytischer Widerstände" [Method for determining large electrolytic resistances]. Zeitschrift für Physikalische Chemie (in German). 18: 133–158.
- Maltby, Margaret (1897). "Methode zur Bestimmung der Periode electrischer Schwingungen" [Method for determining the period of electrical oscillations]. Annalen der Physik und Chemie (in German). 61 (7): 553–577. Bibcode:1897AnP...297..553M. doi:10.1002/andp.18972970710.
- Kohlrausch, Friedrich; Maltby, Margaret (1899). "Das elektrische Leitvermögen wässriger Lösungen von Alkali-Chloriden und Nitraten" [The electrical conductivity of aqueous solutions of alkali chlorides and nitrates]. Sitzungsberichtungen deer Königlichen Preussischen Akademie der Wissenschaften zu Berlin (in German). 36: 655–671.
- Kohlrausch, Friedrich; Maltby, Margaret (1900). "Das elektrische Leitvermögen wässriger Lösungen von Alkali-Chloriden und Nitraten" [The electrical conductivity of aqueous solutions of alkali chlorides and nitrates] (PDF). Wissenschaftliche Abhandlungen der Physikalisch-Technischen Reichsanstalt (in German). 3: 156.

=== Publications on education ===
- Maltby, Margaret (1896). "A Few Points of Comparison between German and American Universities". Proceedings of the Association of Collegiate Alumnae. 2ds. 62 (1).
- Maltby, Margaret (1915). "The Relation of Physics and Chemistry to the College Science Courses". Columbia Quarterly. 18 (56).
- Maltby, Margaret (1920). "The Physicist". In Filene, Catherine (ed.). Careers for Women. Boston: Riverside Press. pp. 430–433. LCCN 20021359.
- Maltby, Margaret (1929). History of Fellowships Awarded by the American Association of University Women, 1888-1929. New York: Columbia University Press. LCCN 30018979.
