= Philip Roe =

Philip or Phil Roe may refer to:

- Phil Roe (politician) (born 1945), American politician and U.S. Representative
- Phil Roe (footballer) (born 1991), English footballer
- Philip L. Roe, British professor of aerospace engineering at the University of Michigan
