= Gene D. Sprouse =

Gene D. Sprouse is a Distinguished Professor of Physics & Astronomy at Stony Brook University and an elected fellow of the American Association for the Advancement of Science (2012). His work is principally in experimental physics using accelerators, lasers, and nuclear spectroscopy to investigate nuclear structure. In particular he has with Luis Orozco studied the element Francium using laser trapping techniques. He was the Editor-in-Chief of the American Physical Society's series Physical Review from 2007 until 2015.
