= Abgrall =

Abgrall is a surname. Notable people with the surname include:

- Dennis Abgrall (born 1953), Canadian ice hockey player
- Jean-Marie Abgrall (born 1950), French forensic psychiatrist
- Noémie Abgrall (born 1999), French cyclist
- Rémi Abgrall (born 1961), French applied mathematician
