= Stephen Forrest =

Electrical Engineer and Physicist

Stephen R. Forrest
- Citizenship: United States
- Education: University of California, Berkeley (B.S. 1972); University of Michigan (Ph.D. 1979)
- Known for: Phosphorescent organic light-emitting diodes
- Scientific career
- Fields: Electrical engineering, Chemical engineering, materials science, physics
- Workplaces: Bell Labs; University of Southern California; Princeton University; University of Michigan
- Thesis: Studies of Ultrafine Metal Particles (1979)
- Doctoral advisor: T. Michael Sanders

Stephen R. Forrest is an American physicist and academic with contributions to organic electronics and optoelectronics. He is the Peter A. Franken Distinguished University Professor of Engineering and Paul G. Goebel Professor of Electrical Engineering at the University of Michigan. He has worked in organic light-emitting diodes (OLEDs), organic solar cells, and organic thin-film transistors.

== Early career ==
Stephen R. Forrest completed his Bachelor of Science in Physics from the University of California, Berkeley in 1972. He then earned his Ph.D. in Physics from the University of Michigan in 1979, where he researched photodetectors and semiconductor materials. Following his Ph.D., Forrest joined Bell Labs as a member of technical staff, where in 1982, he became the Supervisor of the Integrated Optoelectronics Devices and Circuits Group.

== Academic career ==
Forrest began his academic career as an Associate Professor of Electrical Engineering at the University of Southern California in 1985, where he later became a professor and the Director for the Center of Photonic Technology in 1989. In 1992, he moved to Princeton University as a Professor of Electrical Engineering, and later served as the Chair of the Electrical Engineering Department from 1997 to 2001.

In 2006, Forrest joined the University of Michigan as the Vice President for Research, a position he held until 2014. He currently holds the positions of Peter A. Franken Distinguished University Professor and Paul G. Goebel Professor or Engineering, in Electrical Engineering, Physics and Materials Science and Engineering.

== Research ==
Stephen Forrest’s laboratory, the Optoelectronic Components and Materials Group, researches various phenomena and devices related to electronic materials and optics. This involves the investigation of the basic physics of new semiconductor and organic materials, and the application of this knowledge to creating new optoelectronic devices. He is known for his numerous major contributions to organic electronics. His major research areas include OLEDs for displays and lighting, organic and compound semiconductor devices for solar cells, and exciton dynamics in organics. Some other fields of research include thin-film transistors, photodetection, polaritons and strong optical coupling.

Professor Forrest has authored over 620 papers in refereed journals and more than 390 patents. As of 2024, Research.com ranks Stephen Forrest as the top electrical engineer in the United States (second best globally) when ranked by D-index (discipline h-index). He has an h-index of 183 and over 182,000 citations.

== Companies ==
Stephen Forrest has been a co-founder or founding participant in several companies, including Sensors Unlimited, Epitaxx, Inc., NanoFlex Power Corporation, Universal Display Corporation, and Apogee Photonics Inc. He is also on the Board of Directors and the Growth Technology Advisory Board of Applied Materials. Additionally, in 2017, he was briefly selected as the interim Editor of Physical Review Applied.

== Group alumni ==
- Richard Lunt (Graduate Student, 2009) - Professor at Michigan State University
- André Taylor (Research Scientist, 2007-2008) - Professor at New York University Tandon School of Engineering
- Donna Strickland (Research Scientist, 1995-1997) Professor at University of Waterloo, 2018 Recipient of the Nobel Prize in Physics

== Awards and honors ==
- 2026 fellow of the Royal Society of London, England
- 2022 recipient of the IEEE William R. Cherry Award
- 2022 recipient of the H. Scott Fogler Award for Professional Leadership and Service
- 2018 fellow of the American Academy of Arts and Sciences
- 2017 recipient of the IEEE Jun-ichi Nishizawa Medal
- 2016 National Academy of Sciences Member
- 2014 National Academy of Inventors Fellow
- 2008 American Physical Society Fellow
- 2007 recipient of the IEEE Lotfi A. Zadeh Award for Emerging Technologies
- 2006 recipient of the Jan Rajchman Award from the Society for Information Display
- 2003 National Academy of Engineering Member
- 2001 recipient of the IEEE/LEOS William Streiffer Scientific Achievement Award
- 1999 recipient of the Materials Research Society MRS Medal
- 1998 recipient of the IPO National Distinguished Inventor Award
- 1998 recipient of the Thomas Alva Edison Award
- 1996–1997 IEEE/LEOS Distinguished Lecturer Award
- 1991 Institute of Electrical and Electronics Engineers Fellow
