= Philip L. Roe =

English dynamicist (1938–2026)

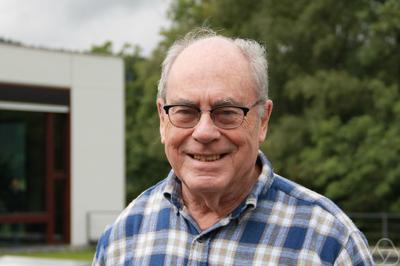
Roe in 2013

Philip L. Roe (4 May 1938 – 26 April 2026) was an English dynamicist who was Professor of Aerospace Engineering at the University of Michigan in Ann Arbor. He is known for his work in the field of Computational Fluid Dynamics and Magnetohydrodynamics. Roe made fundamental contributions to the development of high-resolution schemes for hyperbolic conservation laws. Roe developed approximate Riemann solver called Roe solver for compressible flows with shocks.

== Life and career ==
After completing his education at Cambridge University, United Kingdom, Roe worked for the Royal Aircraft Establishment from 1962 to 1984. Initially he worked in the field of missile aerodynamics and later shifted to CFD and devised the Roe solver for numerical computation of compressible flows with shocks. He published this work in the seminal paper titled "Approximate Riemann solvers, parameter vectors, and difference schemes" which appeared in the Journal of Computational Physics in 1981. In 1984, Phil Roe left Royal Aircraft Establishment and joined Cranfield University. Subsequently, in 1990 he moved to the University of Michigan where he was a Professor of Aerospace Engineering.

Roe died on 26 April 2026, at the age of 87.

== Contributions ==
Roe's most celebrated contribution is the development of the Roe solver, an approximate Riemann solver for the numerical computation of compressible flows with shocks, introduced in his 1981 paper in the Journal of Computational Physics. The scheme, commonly known as the "Roe flux" or "Roe scheme," has been cited more than 14,000 times and remains a standard method in specialised CFD textbooks across a wide variety of disciplines.

Roe was also a pioneer of upwind-differencing methods for CFD, contributing to a class of methods that remain dominant for problems in fluid mechanics and related fields. He was one of the originators of the waverider concept for hypersonic flight, in which a vehicle is specifically designed so as to ride atop the shock waves generated by its own leading edges.

In the final stage of his career, Roe developed the Active Flux method, a new third-order accurate CFD approach that moves beyond conventional Riemann-solver-based methods by using both cell-average and point-value degrees of freedom with an exact evolution operator. The method has inspired research groups in mathematics, physics, and engineering worldwide. He served as Editor-in-Chief of the Journal of Computational Physics from 1992 to 1994, and as William Penney Visiting Professor at Cambridge University from 2008 to 2016.

== Awards and honours ==
Roe received the NASA Group Achievement Award in 1992. He was elected a Fellow of the American Institute of Aeronautics and Astronautics (AIAA) in 1996. In 2015, he received the AIAA Fluid Dynamics Award, which is presented annually for outstanding contributions to the understanding of the behaviour of liquids and gases in motion as related to aeronautics and astronautics.

== Selected publications ==
- Roe, P. L. (1981), "Approximate Riemann solvers, parameter vectors, and difference schemes", J. Comput. Phys., 43 (2): 357–372, Bibcode:1981JCoPh..43..357R, doi:10.1016/0021-9991(81)90128-5
- Roe, P. L. (1986), "Characteristic-Based Schemes for the Euler Equations", Annu. Rev. Fluid Mech., 18: 337–365, Bibcode:1986AnRFM..18..337R, doi:10.1146/annurev.fl.18.010186.002005
- Starinshak, D. P.; Karni, S.; Roe, P. L. (2014), "A new level set model for multimaterial flows", J. Comput. Phys., 262: 116–131, doi:10.1016/j.jcp.2013.12.036
- Roe, P. L. (2017), "Is Discontinuous Reconstruction Really a Good Idea?", J. Sci. Comput., 73: 1094–1114, doi:10.1007/s10915-017-0555-z
- Barsukow, W.; Hohm, J.; Klingenberg, C.; Roe, P. L. (2019), "The Active Flux Scheme on Cartesian Grids and Its Low Mach Number Limit", J. Sci. Comput., 81: 594–622, doi:10.1007/s10915-019-01031-z
- Roe, P. L. (2021), "My Way—A Computational Autobiography", Commun. Appl. Math. Comput., 3: 85–110, doi:10.1007/s42967-020-00064-8
- Roe, P. L. (2024), "Musings of a Computational Philosopher", Commun. Appl. Math. Comput., doi:10.1007/s42967-024-00425-3
