= Jürgen Schmitt (physicist) =

German astronomer and physicist

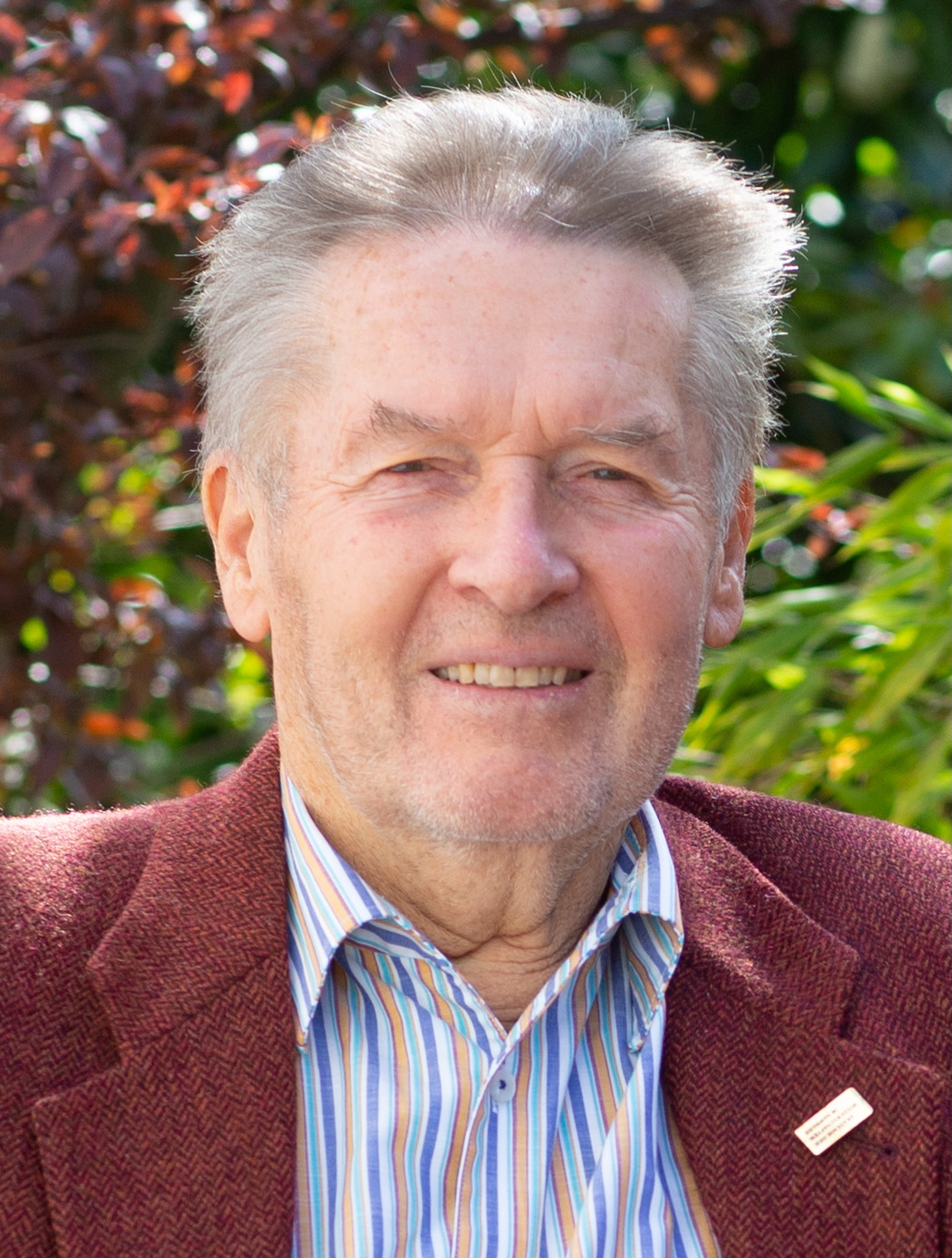
- Jürgen Schmitt
- Born: May 25, 1953 (age 73); Würzburg, Germany
- Education: University of Würzburg Germany (Physics diploma 1978) King's College London London, England (Masters in Applied Mathematics 1977) Harvard University, Cambridge, MA, USA (Ph. D 1984)
- Scientific career
- Fields: Astrophysics, Physics
- Workplaces: Max Planck Institute for Extraterrestrial Physics, Munich, Germany (1984–1998) Center for EUV Astrophysics at University of California, Berkeley, CA USA (1994–1995) University of Hamburg Hamburg, Germany (1998–)
- Thesis: Theoretical and observational studies of stellar activity
- Doctoral advisor: Robert Rosner
- Notable students: Ansgar Reiners, Katja Poppenhäger

Jürgen Schmitt (born May 25, 1953) is a German astronomer and physicist at the University of Hamburg, where he is a professor of astrophysics. His research is centered in the fields of X-ray astronomy and stellar activity; he has studied X-ray emission of cool solar-like stars, comets and the Moon as well as the effects of activity on exoplanets systems.

== Early life and career ==
Schmitt was born in 1953 in Würzburg, Germany where he received his Abitur at the Röntgengymnasium (in Würzburg) in 1972. He studied physics at the University of Würzburg from 1972 to 1978, writing his diploma thesis on the Cosmic Microwave Background in anisotropic cosmologies. From 1976 to 1977 he studied at King's College London under the supervision of Paul Davies receiving a master's degree in Applied Mathematics in 1977. For his PhD studies he moved to Harvard University, Cambridge, Massachusetts, in 1979, where he studied stellar activity driven by a strong Stellar magnetic field, analogous to Solar phenomena, under the supervision of Robert Rosner at Harvard University, receiving his doctorate in 1984.

After his PhD, Schmitt moved to the Max Planck Institute for Extraterrestrial Physics (MPE), where he worked on the ROSAT project from 1984 to 1998. While at MPE, he was responsible for the mission operations, and he furthered the field of stellar X-ray astronomy both with ROSAT All-Sky Survey and pointing observations. Schmitt spent 1993–1994 on sabbatical at the Center for EUV Astrophysics, University of California, Berkeley, to work with Stuart Bowyer on extreme ultraviolet data from stars and their relation to X-rays. He received his Habilitation at LMU Munich and began university teaching.

In 1998 he moved to Hamburg Observatory to become a full professor in astrophysics, where he continued his teaching and supervised more than two dozen doctoral students through their dissertations.

Schmitt retired in 2019, yet (as of 2025) continues his research as a professor emeritus.

== Research and achievements ==
Schmitt's career focus has been on magnetic field induced activity on late-type stars such as Starspots and flares in the framework of the so-called solar-stellar connection. He focused first on the X-ray range and expanded later to the optical regime utilizing both photometry and spectroscopy. With the detection of the first extrasolar planets around cool stars in 1995, magnetic activity on cool stars received new momentum, since it became increasingly clear that neither the data nor the physics of extrasolar planet systems could be understood without a thorough understanding of the effects of stellar activity. This idea was also the basis of Research Training Group (RTG) "Exosolar planets and their host stars" funded by the Deutsche Forschungsgemeinschaft (DFG), which ran from 2007 to 2015; Schmitt's team played a leading role in examining how stellar activity can affect planet detection.

Schmitt's research activities were not restricted to cool stars but covered also other areas. While working at Max Planck Institute for Extraterrestrial Physics working on ROSAT, Schmitt and his colleagues detected X-rays from the Moon (both from the Sun-lit and dark side) as well as from comets. Schmitt carried out the first X-ray census of cool stars in the solar neighborhood and demonstrated that all solar-like stars have coronae like the Sun and that a minimal X-ray surface flux exists. After the launch of XMM-Newton in 1999, Schmitt engaged both in X-ray spectroscopy and simultaneous optical and X-ray observations; one focus of his studies were massive flares observed on stars like CN Leo, Algol and AB Dor.

Schmitt and his group also discovered stellar coronal emission in the optical using the VLT/UVES combination to measure forbidden lines of ionized iron. After the launches of CoRoT, Kepler Space Telescope and Transiting Exoplanet Survey Satellite, Schmitt and his group used space photometry to study spotted stars with and without planets; they showed how planetary spot crossings could be used to study the star spot distributions on active stars.

Finally, Schmitt used the TIGRE facility in Guanajuato, Mexico, to search for stellar cycles in Calcium and obtain activity monitoring (in Ca II) over 60 years.

== Gallery ==
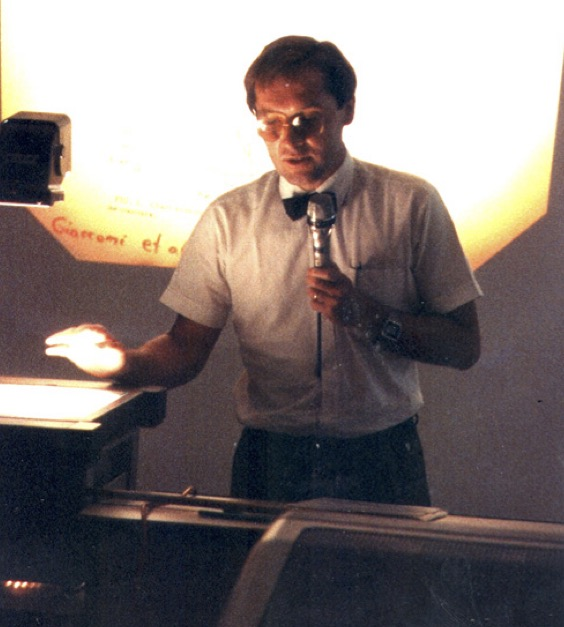
Jürgen Schmitt presents the observations of the moon in soft X-rays obtained by the Röntgen Observatory Satellite ROSAT

== Memberships ==
- European Space Agency Astronomy Working Group (1995–1998)
- European Space Agency Space Science Advisory Committee (2011–2014)
- Academy of Sciences and Humanities in Hamburg (2009–)
- DLR Programmausschuss Extraterrestrische Grundlagenforschung (2011–2017)
- Scientific Advisory Committee Leibniz Institute for Solar Physics (formerly Kiepenheuer Institute for Solar Physics) – Chairman (2012–2020)
- Studienstiftung des deutschen Volkes
