= Physics, Physique, Fizika =

Scientific journal, 1964-1968

Physics Physique Физика
- Discipline: Physics
- Language: English, French, Russian
- Edited by: Philip Warren Anderson; Bernd T. Matthias

Publication details
- History: 1964–1968
- Publisher: Pergamon Press; Physics Publishing Co.
- Frequency: Bimonthly

Standard abbreviations
- ISO 4: Phys. Phys. Fiz.

Indexing
- ISSN: 0554-128X
- OCLC no.: 1370169

Links
- Journal homepage

Physics Physique Физика, also known as various punctuations of Physics, Physique, Fizika, and as Physics for short, was a scientific journal published from 1964 through 1968. Founded by Philip Warren Anderson and Bernd T. Matthias, who were inspired by wide-circulation literary magazines like Harper's, the journal's original goal was to print papers of interest to scientists in all branches of physics. It is best known for publishing John Stewart Bell's paper on the result now known as Bell's theorem.

Failing to attract sufficient interest as an unspecialized journal, Physics Physique Физика soon focused on solid-state physics before folding altogether in 1968. The journal was funded by Robert Maxwell. Anderson stated that it stopped "not because it lacked submissions, but because they had promised contributors rapid publication and Maxwell kept increasing the time between the appearances of successive issues." The four volumes of this journal were eventually made freely available online by the American Physical Society.

Bell chose to publish his theorem in this journal because it did not require page charges, and at the time it in fact paid the authors who published there. Because the journal did not provide free reprints of articles for the authors to distribute, however, Bell had to spend the money he received to buy copies that he could send to other physicists. While the articles printed in the journal themselves listed the publication's name simply as Physics, the covers carried the trilingual version Physics Physique Физика to reflect that it would print articles in English, French and Russian. In 1967, the unusual title caught the attention of John Clauser, who then discovered Bell's paper and began to consider how to perform a Bell test experiment in the laboratory. Clauser and Stuart Freedman would go on to perform a Bell test experiment in 1972.

== Selected publications ==
The following are among the most highly cited articles published in the journal during its four-year time span.

- Susskind, Leonard; Glogower, Jonathan (1964-07-01). "Quantum mechanical phase and time operator". Physics Physique Fizika. 1 (1): 49–61. doi:10.1103/PhysicsPhysiqueFizika.1.49.
- Gell-Mann, Murray (1964-07-01). "The symmetry group of vector and axial vector currents". Physics Physique Fizika. 1 (1): 63–75. doi:10.1103/PhysicsPhysiqueFizika.1.63.
- Bell, J. S. (1964-11-01). "On the Einstein Podolsky Rosen paradox". Physics Physique Fizika. 1 (3): 195–200. doi:10.1103/PhysicsPhysiqueFizika.1.195.
- Kadanoff, Leo P. (1966-06-01). "Scaling laws for Ising models near T_{c}". Physics Physique Fizika. 2 (6): 263–272. doi:10.1103/PhysicsPhysiqueFizika.2.263.
- Fisher, Michael E. (1967-10-01). "The theory of condensation and the critical point". Physics Physique Fizika. 3 (5): 255–283. doi:10.1103/PhysicsPhysiqueFizika.3.255.

== See also ==
- Epistemological Letters
