= Richard Lunt =

American physicist and academic

Richard R. Lunt
- Citizenship: United States
- Education: University of Delaware (B.S. 2004), Princeton University (Ph.D. 2010)
- Known for: Invisible solar cells
- Awards: Ovshinsky Sustainable Energy Award (2015), Camille and Henry Dreyfus Postdoctoral Environmental Chemistry Mentor Award (2015), DuPont Young Professor Award (2013), NSF CAREER Award (2013)
- Scientific career
- Fields: Chemical engineering, materials science, physics
- Thesis: The Growth, Characterization, and Application of Highly Ordered Small Molecule Semiconducting Thin Films (2010)
- Doctoral advisor: Stephen R. Forrest

Richard Royal Lunt is a chemical engineer, materials scientist, physicist, and the Johansen Crosby Professor of Chemical Engineering and Materials Science at Michigan State University (MSU) in East Lansing, Michigan, in the United States. He is most well known for the development of invisible solar cells.

== Early life and education ==
Lunt was born outside of Philadelphia in 1982. At age 10 he moved to Lexington, Massachusetts. He then attended the University of Delaware, where he received his bachelor's degree in chemical engineering in 2004. He received his Ph.D. from Princeton University in 2010 and performed postdoctoral research at the Massachusetts Institute of Technology until 2011. He moved to MSU in 2011 after starting to build his laboratory in 2010. He is married to Dr. Sophia Lunt, a professor in the Department of Biochemistry and Molecular Biology at MSU.

== Research ==
Lunt's research lab is focused on developing organic and quantum dot electronics. He is known for developing a key method to measure exciton diffusion lengths and for pioneering the first invisible solar cells, invisible solar concentrators, and phosphorescent nanocluster light emitting diodes. Lunt is a cofounder of Ubiquitous Energy, Inc., which is focused on commercializing clear solar cells.

== Honors ==
Lunt’s work has been recognized by a number of awards, including: the NSF CAREER Award in 2013; the DuPont Young Professor Award in 2013; the Camille and Henry Dreyfus Postdoctoral Environmental Chemistry Mentor Award in 2015; and the 2015 Ovshinsky Sustainable Energy Award from the American Physical Society. In 2016, he was named to the MIT Technology Review TR35 as one of the top 35 innovators in the world under the age of 35. Lunt has also been recognized for his devotion and skill in teaching.
