= Topical Group on Compression of Condensed Matter =

APS Topical Group on Compression of Condensed Matter
- Founded: 1984
- Type: Professional Organization
- Purpose: High pressures in condensed matter
- Region served: Worldwide
- Method: Conferences, Publications
- Members: 400
- Chair: Peter Celliers (2023)
- Website: https://engage.aps.org/gccm/home

The Topical Group on Compression of Condensed Matter (GCCM) is a Unit of the American Physical Society (APS). The objective of the GCCM is the advancement and dissemination of knowledge on the physics of materials under high-pressure loading including shock physics, the effect of shock waves on materials, dynamic behavior of materials, and materials in extremes. Originally formed in 1984 as the Topical Group on the Shock Compression of Condensed Matter, the group has sponsored the Biennial International Conference on Shock Compression of Condensed Matter (SCCM) and awards the George E. Duvall Shock Compression Science Award. The Topical Group changed to its current name in 2023 to reflect a broader community including static high compression experiments.

While specific topics and session names are set for each Biennial SCCM Conference, frequent topics include:

- Detonation and shock induced chemistry
- Energetic and reactive materials
- Equations of State
- Experimental developments
- First-principles and molecular dynamics
- Geophysics and planetary science
- Grain scale to continuum modeling
- High-energy density physics/Warm dense matter
- Inelastic deformations, fracture, and spall
- Materials Strength
- Particulate, porous, and composite materials
- Phase transitions
- Soft matter, polymers, and biomaterials

Recently one-off focused sessions have been organized on topics such as:

- X-ray free electron lasers and materials, Velocimetry diagnostic development, and Turbulence and Mixing
- Deep Carbon Budget, High Energy Density Materials, and Dynamic Response of Materials
- Post Shock Turbulence, Meso and Macro Scales, and Material Strength at High Pressure

The Topical Group publishes a series of Proceeds from the conferences, with the majority of proceedings published by the American Institute of Physics (1981, 1993 to 2011.) For the 2013 conference the proceeds was published by the Institute of Physics and was Open Access for the first time.
