= Physical Review A =

- Discipline: Atomic, molecular, and optical and quantum information
- Language: English
- Edited by: Jan M. Rost

Publication details
- Former names: Physical Review; Physical Review A, General Physics; Physical Review A: Atomic, Molecular and Optical Physics
- History: 1970–present
- Publisher: American Physical Society (United States)
- Frequency: Monthly
- Open access: Hybrid
- Impact factor: 3 (2025)

Standard abbreviations
- ISO 4: Phys. Rev. A

Indexing
- CODEN: PRAHC3
- ISSN: 2469-9926 (print); 2469-9934 (web)
- LCCN: 2015203968
- OCLC no.: 932205193

Links
- Journal homepage

Physical Review A (also known as PRA) is a monthly peer-reviewed scientific journal published by the American Physical Society covering atomic, molecular, and optical physics and quantum information. As of 2021 the editor was Jan M. Rost (Max Planck Institute for the Physics of Complex Systems).

== History ==
In 1893, the Physical Review was established at Cornell University. It was taken over by the American Physical Society (formed in 1899) in 1913. In 1970, Physical Review was subdivided into Physical Review A, B, C, and D. At that time, section A was subtitled Physical Review A: General Physics. In 1990, a process was started to split this journal into two, resulting in the creation of Physical Review E in 1993. Hence, in 1993, Physical Review A changed its statement of scope to Atomic, Molecular and Optical Physics. In January 2007, the section of Physical Review E that published papers on classical optics was merged into Physical Review A, unifying the classical and quantum parts of optics into a single journal. In 2016, Physical Review A broadened its formal statement of coverage to explicitly include quantum information, which has been a section within the journal since 1998.

== Rapid Communications ==
Physical Review A Rapid Communications was introduced in 1981 to provide a venue for quick publication of high-impact articles similar to Physical Review Letters, but for a more specialized audience. As of May 1, 2012, the editors have made the requirement for significance in Rapid articles more explicit. In addition, as of March 8, 2010, the editors have placed newly published Rapid Communications articles on rotation as highlights on the Physical Review A website, to give them more visibility.

== Editors' Suggestions ==
In August 2013, Physical Review A started marking a few papers published in the journal that the editors found to be of particular interest, importance, or clarity as Editors' Suggestions to give them higher visibility.

== Abstracting and indexing ==
As of 2020 Physical Review journals were abstracted and indexed in:

- Chemical Abstracts Service/CASSI
- Inspec
- Clarivate Web of Science
- Google Scholar
- INSPIRE-HEP
- NASA Astrophysics Data System (ADS)
- PubMed
- Scopus

According to the Journal Citation Reports, the journal had an impact factor of 3 in 2025.
