= Marcia Keith =

American physicist (1859–1950)

Marcia Anna Keith
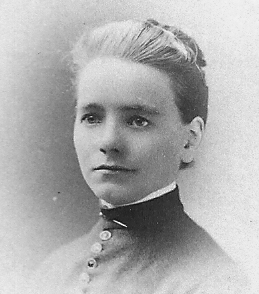
- Born: September 10, 1859; Brockton, Massachusetts
- Died: 1950 (aged 90–91)
- Education: Mount Holyoke
- Known for: Teaching physics, especially to women
- Scientific career
- Fields: Physics
- Workplaces: Public school system of Massachusetts, Michigan Seminary, Lake Erie College, Mount Holyoke, Norton

Marcia Anna Keith (1859–1950) was an American physicist, teacher of physics to women, and a charter member of the American Physical Society since its founding in 1899.

== Early life and education ==
Marcia Keith was born in Brockton, Massachusetts on 10 September 1859 to parents Mary Ann (née Cary) and Arza Keith (married 25 April 1854). She attended Mount Holyoke College, earning her bachelor's degree in 1892. She was a “special student” at Worcester Polytechnic Institute in 1887 and 1889, and went to the University of Berlin from 1897 to 1898. In the summer of 1901, Keith attended the University of Chicago.

== Teaching career ==
From 1876 until 1879 Keith taught in the public school system of Massachusetts. Four years later, in 1883, she began to work as a science instructor at the Michigan Seminary, in Kalamazoo until 1885. Beginning in 1885, Keith taught mathematics at Mount Holyoke, and then became the school's first full-time teacher in the physics department there. From 1889 until 1903, Keith was the head of the department. In 1904, Keith taught at Norton. She taught at Lake Erie College in Painesville, Ohio, from 1905 until 1906.

Keith was a pioneer in the education of women in the science of physics. It is believed that she is the first to introduce individual laboratory work to students. She also launched the physics colloquium at Mt. Holyoke in order to increase awareness among students of the growing field of physics.

== Research ==
Keith investigated the physics of heat transmission in gases at low temperatures.

== Non-academic career ==
From 1906 until 1908 Keith worked for the firm of Herbert C. Keith in New York City as a consulting engineer.

== American Physical Society ==
Keith was a charter member of the American Physical Society, helping to establish the group in 1899. Keith and Isabelle Stone of Vasser were the only two women in attendance at the founding of the group.

== Family ==
Marcia Anna had four sisters, Lucy Keith, Mary Helen Keith, Sarah Emma Keith, and Cora Frances Keith, and a niece, Mary Keith Warren.

== See also ==
- Timeline of women in science
