= Physical Review E =

- Discipline: Many-body phenomena
- Language: English
- Edited by: Dario Corradini

Publication details
- Former names: Physical Review, Physical Review A: General Physics
- History: 1993 to present
- Publisher: American Physical Society (United States)
- Frequency: Monthly
- Open access: Partial (see text)
- Impact factor: 2.4 (2024)

Standard abbreviations
- ISO 4: Phys. Rev. E

Indexing
- CODEN: PRESCM
- ISSN: 2470-0045 (print); 2470-0053 (web)
- LCCN: 2001227060
- OCLC no.: 45808357

Links
- Journal homepage

Physical Review E is a peer-reviewed, scientific journal, published monthly by the American Physical Society. The main field of interest is collective phenomena of many-body systems. It is edited by Dario Corradini as of December 2024. While original research content requires subscription, editorials, news, and other non-research content is openly accessible.

== Scope ==
Although the focus of this journal is many-body phenomena, the broad scope of the journal includes quantum chaos, soft matter physics, classical chaos, biological physics and granular materials.

Also emphasized are statistical physics, equilibrium and transport properties of fluids, liquid crystals, complex fluids, polymers, chaos, fluid dynamics, plasma physics, classical physics, and computational physics.

== Former names ==
This journal began as "Physical Review" in 1893. In 1913 the American Physical Society took over Physical Review. In 1970 Physical Review was subdivided into Physical Review A, B, C, and D. From 1990 until 1993 a process was underway which split the journal then entitled Physical Review A: General Physics into two journals. Hence, from 1993 until 2000, one of the split off journals became Physical Review E: Statistical Physics, Plasmas, Fluids, and Related Interdisciplinary Topics. In 2001 the journal was changed, in name, to its present title. As an aside, in January 2007, the section which published works on classical optics was transferred from Physical Review E to Physical Review A. This action unified the classical and quantum parts of optics into a single journal.

== Rapid Communications ==
Physical Review E Rapid Communications was announced on June 7, 2010. This section (or feature) gives priority to results which are deemed significant, and merits a prominent display on the Physical Review E website. The specific article is displayed for several weeks, and is part of a rotation with other articles, also deemed significant.

== Abstracting and indexing ==
Physical Review E is indexed in the following bibliographic databases:

- Science Citation Index Expanded
- Current Contents / Physical, Chemical & Earth Sciences
- Chemical Abstracts Service - CASSI
- Current Physics Index
- Inspec
- MEDLINE
- Index Medicus
- PubMed
- NLM catalog
- Physics Abstracts
- SPIN

== See also ==
- American Journal of Physics
- Annales Henri Poincaré
- Applied Physics Express
- CRC Handbook of Chemistry and Physics
- European Physical Journal E
- Journal of Physical and Chemical Reference Data
- Journal of Physics A
