= Isabelle Stone =

American physicist (1868–1966)

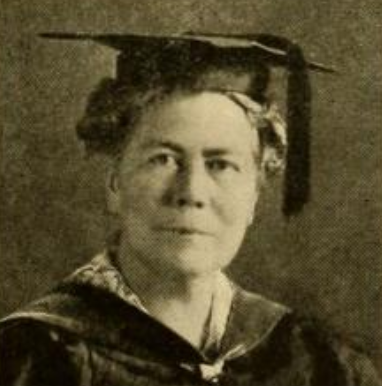
- Isabelle Stone, from a 1920 yearbook
- Born: October 18, 1868; Chicago, Illinois, US
- Died: 1966 (aged 97–98)
- Education: Wellesley College; University of Chicago
- Scientific career
- Workplaces: Bryn Mawr School; Vassar College; Sweet Briar College
- Thesis: On the Electrical Resistance of Thin Films (1897)
- Doctoral advisor: Albert A. Michelson

Isabelle Stone (October 18, 1868 – 1966) was an American physicist and educator. She was one of the founders of the American Physical Society. She was among the first women to earn a PhD in physics in the United States.

== Early life and education ==
Stone was born in 1868 to Harriet H. Leonard Stone and Leander Stone in Chicago. Her father was an editor of the Chicago Times, and her mother was the president of the Chicago YWCA and a charter member of the Daughters of the American Revolution.

Stone completed a bachelor's degree at Wellesley College in 1890.

She then completed her doctoral work at the University of Chicago under Albert A. Michelson, earning her PhD in 1897. Stone was the first woman to earn a PhD in physics at the University of Chicago. She was also among the first women to earn a PhD in physics in the United States, earning hers just two years after Caroline Willard Baldwin earned a Doctor of Science from Cornell University in 1895.

== Career ==
After completing her undergraduate education at Wellesley College, Stone moved back to Chicago where she worked at Hull House under Jane Addams.

Stone taught for a year at the Bryn Mawr School in Baltimore. She was a physics instructor at Vassar College from 1898 to 1906, and head of the physics department at Sweet Briar College from 1915 to 1923. From 1908 to 1914, she and her sister Harriet Stone ran a school for American girls in Rome, and then in 1927 they founded The Misses Stone's School for Girls in Washington, D.C.

Stone was one of two women (out of a total of 836) to attend the first International Congress of Physics in Paris (the other being Marie Curie). In 1899, she was one of forty physicists (and one of two women, the other being Marcia Keith) at the first meeting of the American Physical Society, held at Columbia University.

Stone's research focused on the electrical resistance and other properties of thin films. Her 1897 thesis, On the Electrical Resistance of Thin Films, showed that very thin metal films showed a higher resistivity than the bulk metal.

== Publications ==
- On the electrical resistance of thin films, January 1898, Physical Review, vol. VI, no. 30
- Color in Platinum Films, July 1905, Physical Review (Series I), vol. 21, Issue 1, pp. 27–40
- Properties of thin films when deposited in a vacuum

== Personal life ==
Stone lived with her sister Harriet Stone in Washington, D.C. and then in Miami in her later years. Some of her letters are in the papers of George B. Pegram at Columbia University.

== See also ==
- Timeline of women in science
