= Physical Review Applied =

- Discipline: Applied physics
- Language: English
- Edited by: Matthew D. Eager

Publication details
- History: 2014-present
- Publisher: American Physical Society (United States)
- Frequency: Monthly
- Open access: Hybrid
- Impact factor: 4.4 (2025)

Standard abbreviations
- ISO 4: Phys. Rev. Appl.

Indexing
- CODEN: PRAHB2
- ISSN: 2331-7019
- LCCN: 2013203872
- OCLC no.: 861358736

Links
- Journal homepage; Online archive

Physical Review Applied is a monthly peer-reviewed, scientific journal covering applied physics. It is published by the American Physical Society and the editor-in-chief is Matt Eager. The journal is part of the Physical Review family of journals.

According to the Journal Citation Reports, the journal has a 2025 impact factor of 4.4.
