= Physical Review Accelerators and Beams =

- Discipline: Accelerator physics
- Language: English
- Edited by: Frank Zimmermann

Publication details
- Former names: Physical Review Special Topics - Accelerators and Beams
- History: 1998-present
- Publisher: American Physical Society
- Frequency: Monthly
- Open access: Yes
- License: CC-BY 4.0 International
- Impact factor: 1.879 (2021)

Standard abbreviations
- ISO 4: Phys. Rev. Accel. Beams

Indexing
- CODEN: PRABCJ
- ISSN: 2469-9888
- LCCN: sn98004261
- OCLC no.: 932197551

Links
- Journal homepage; Online archive

Physical Review Accelerators and Beams is a monthly peer-reviewed open-access scientific journal, published by the American Physical Society. The journal focuses on accelerator physics and engineering. Its lead editor is Frank Zimmermann (CERN). The journal was established in 1998 as Physical Review Special Topics – Accelerators and Beams, obtaining its current title in 2016. The journal does not require article processing charges, being sponsored by academic and industrial institutions.

== Abstracting and indexing ==
The journal is abstracted and indexed in:

- Current Contents/Physical, Chemical & Earth Sciences
- Inspec
- Science Citation Index Expanded
- Scopus

According to the Journal Citation Reports, the journal has a 2021 impact factor of 1.879.
