= Physics (magazine) =

Open-access scholarly publication

- Editor: Matteo Rini
- Deputy Editor: Katherine Wright
- Categories: Physics
- Publisher: American Physical Society
- Founded: 2008
- Country: United States
- Based in: Ridge, NY
- Website: physics.aps.org
- ISSN: 1943-2879
- OCLC: 819219406

Physics is an open-access online publication containing commentaries on the best of the peer-reviewed research published in the journals of the American Physical Society. The editor-in-chief of Physics is Matteo Rini. It highlights papers in Physical Review Letters and the Physical Review family of journals. The magazine was established in 2008.

== Features ==
Physics contains three types of commentaries on research papers: journalistic articles ("Focus"), in depth pieces written by active researchers ("Viewpoints"), and short summaries of a research paper ("Synopsis") written by editorial staff. Readers get free access to the underlying research papers on which the commentaries are based.
