= Rémi Abgrall =

French mathematician

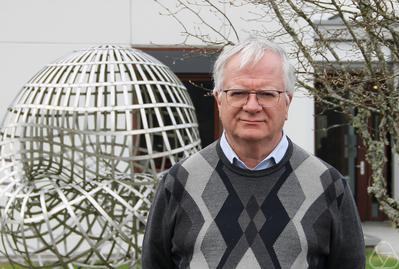
- Abgrall in Oberwolfach, 2024
- Born: 1961 (age 64–65)
- Education: Pierre and Marie Curie University
- Occupation: Mathematician
- Awards: Prix Blaise-Pascal (2001)

Rémi Abgrall (born 1961) is a French applied mathematician. He is known for his contributions in computational fluid dynamics, numerical analysis of conservation laws, multiphase flow and Hamilton–Jacobi equations. He has been editor in chief of the Journal of Computational Physics since 2015 and is part of the editorial board of several international scientific journals. In 2014 he was invited speaker at the International Congress of Mathematics in Seoul. He is author of more than 100 scientific papers published in international scientific journals. He is editor of 4 books and author of one book on advanced topics concerning computational fluid dynamics, high-resolution schemes and conservation laws.

== Education and career ==
Abgrall received his degree in mathematics at École normale supérieure de Saint-Cloud in 1985 and his PhD at Pierre and Marie Curie University in 1987 with a thesis entitled Conception d’un modèle semi-lagrangien de turbulence bidimensionnelle. He worked at ONERA and then at Inria as a research scientist. From 1996 until 2013 he was professor at University of Bordeaux 1 and then at Institut polytechnique de Bordeaux. Since 2014, he has been a professor of numerical analysis at the University of Zurich.

== Honours and awards ==
In 2001 he received the Prix Blaise-Pascal from the French Academy of Sciences. He is honorary member of the Institut Universitaire de France. In 2008 he got an advanced CORDIS grant from the European Research Council. He was elected as a Fellow of the Society for Industrial and Applied Mathematics, in the 2022 Class of SIAM Fellows, "for fundamental contributions to the development of numerical methods for conservation laws, in particular for multi-fluid flows and residual distribution schemes".
