= Chris Leighton =

British materials scientist

- Born: Christopher Leighton
- Education: Durham University (BSc, PhD)
- Scientific career
- Fields: Material physics
- Workplaces: University of Minnesota
- Thesis: Persistent photoconductivity and the metal-insulator transition in Cd(_1-x)Mn(_x)Te:In (1998)
- Doctoral advisor: Ian Terry

Christopher Leighton is a British physicist. He is Distinguished McKnight University Professor of Chemical Engineering and Materials Science at the University of Minnesota.

Leighton holds a BSc in physics (1994) and a PhD in Condensed Matter Physics (1998) from Durham University. From 1998 to 2001, he was a postdoc in material physics at the University of California, San Diego.

Leighton was elected a Fellow of the American Physical Society in 2012 and an IEEE Fellow in 2020. His research revolves around the electronic and magnetic properties of a wide range of novel materials, including complex oxides, oxide heterostructures, metallic spintronics, complex alloys, organic conductors, and photovoltaics.

== Selected publications ==
- Leighton, Chris; Nogués, Josep; Jönsson-Åkerman, B. J.; Schuller, Ivan K. (2000). "Coercivity enhancement in exchange biased systems driven by interfacial magnetic frustration". Physical Review Letters. 84 (15): 3466–3469. Bibcode:2000PhRvL..84.3466L. doi:10.1103/PhysRevLett.84.3466. PMID 11019116.
- Wu, Jiansheng; Leighton, Chris (2003). "Glassy ferromagnetism and magnetic phase separation in La₁₋ₓSrₓCoO₃". Physical Review B. 67 (17) 174408. doi:10.1103/PhysRevB.67.174408.
- Lee, Sangwoo; Leighton, Chris; Bates, Frank S. (2014). "Sphericity and symmetry breaking in the formation of Frank–Kasper phases from one-component materials". Proceedings of the National Academy of Sciences. 111 (50): 17723–17731. Bibcode:2014PNAS..11117723L. doi:10.1073/pnas.1408678111. PMC 4273414. PMID 25378703.
- Leighton, Chris (2019). "Electrolyte-based ionic control of functional oxides". Nature Materials. 18 (1): 13–18. Bibcode:2019NatMa..18...13L. doi:10.1038/s41563-018-0246-7. PMID 30542099.
