= Physical Review Fluids =

- Discipline: Fluid dynamics
- Language: English
- Edited by: Eric Lauga, Beverley McKeon

Publication details
- History: 2016–present
- Publisher: American Physical Society
- Frequency: Monthly
- Impact factor: 2.5 (2023)

Standard abbreviations
- ISO 4: Phys. Rev. Fluids

Indexing
- ISSN: 2469-990X
- LCCN: 2015203966

Links
- Journal homepage; Online archive

Physical Review Fluids is a peer-reviewed scientific journal, published monthly by the American Physical Society. The journal focuses on fluid dynamics and also covers geophysical fluid dynamics, biofluid dynamics, nanofluidics and magnetohydrodynamics. Its lead editors are Eric Lauga (University of Cambridge) and Beverley McKeon (California Institute of Technology).

The journal launched in January 2016 and published its 500th article in 2017.

== Abstracting and indexing ==
The journal is abstracted and indexed in different databases, including:

- Current Contents/Physical, Chemical & Earth Sciences
- Inspec
- Science Citation Index Expanded
- Scopus

According to the Journal Citation Reports, the journal has a 2023 impact factor of 2.5.
