= Journal of Computational Physics =

- Discipline: Computational physics
- Language: English
- Edited by: R. Abgrall

Publication details
- History: 1966-present
- Publisher: Elsevier
- Frequency: Biweekly
- Impact factor: 3.9 (2025)

Standard abbreviations
- ISO 4: J. Comput. Phys.

Indexing
- CODEN: JCTPAH
- ISSN: 0021-9991 (print); 1090-2716 (web)
- LCCN: 68007628
- OCLC no.: 01640027

Links
- Journal homepage; Online access

The Journal of Computational Physics is a bimonthly scientific journal covering computational physics that was established in 1966 and is published by Elsevier. As of 2015, its editor-in-chief is Rémi Abgrall (University of Zurich). According to the Journal Citation Reports, Journal of Computational Physics has a 2025 impact factor of 3.9.

== See also ==
- List of fluid mechanics journals
- List of physics journals
