= Journal of Experiments in Fluid Mechanics =

Journal

Journal of Experiments in Fluid Mechanics Shiyan Liuti Lixue
- Discipline: Fluid dynamics
- Language: Chinese, English
- Edited by: Jialing Le

Publication details
- Former name(s): Aerodynamic Experiments and Measurement Control; Experiments and Measurements in Fluid Mechanics; Liuti Lixue Shiyan Yu Celiang
- History: 1987–present
- Publisher: China Aerodynamics Research Society
- Frequency: Bimonthly

Standard abbreviations
- ISO 4: J. Exp. Fluid Mech.

Indexing
- CODEN: SLLHAD
- ISSN: 1672-9897

Links
- Journal homepage; Current issue; Online archive

The Journal of Experiments in Fluid Mechanics (Chinese: 实验流体力学, romanized: Shiyan Liuti Lixue) is a peer-reviewed scientific journal covering fluid dynamics, published bimonthly by the China Aerodynamics Research Society. The current editor-in-chief is Jialing Le. The journal publishes articles in Chinese and English. It is indexed in CAS and Scopus, ranking 122/153 in the category 'Aerospace Engineering'.

== History ==
The journal was established in 1987 as Aerodynamic Experiments and Measurement Control (Chinese: 气动实验与测量控制) and then renamed to Experiments and Measurements in Fluid Mechanics (Chinese: 流体力学实验与测量) in 1997. Since 2005 it's published under the current name Journal of Experiments in Fluid Mechanics.
