= Robert Rosner =

American astrophysicist (born 1947)

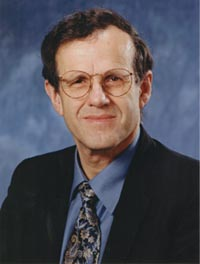
- Born: Garmisch-Partenkirchen, Germany
- Education: Harvard University
- Scientific career
- Fields: Astrophysics
- Workplaces: University of Chicago

Robert Rosner (born June 26, 1947) is an astrophysicist and founding director of the Energy Policy Institute at the University of Chicago, where he is the William E. Wrather Distinguished Service Professor in the departments of Astronomy and Astrophysics and Physics.

Rosner was the director of Argonne National Laboratory from 2005 to 2009. Prior to this appointment, his research was focused primarily on astrophysical fluid dynamics and plasma physics problems.

Rosner is a member of the Norwegian Academy of Science and Letters. He was elected to serve as the 2023 President of the American Physical Society.
