= Fluid Dynamics (journal) =

- Discipline: Fluid Mechanics
- Language: English
- Edited by: Sergei T. Surzhikov

Publication details
- History: 1966–present
- Publisher: Springer Science+Business Media
- Frequency: Bimonthly/monthly
- Open access: Hybrid
- Impact factor: 0.6 (2024)

Standard abbreviations
- ISO 4: Fluid Dyn.

Indexing
- ISSN: 0015-4628 (print); 1573-8507 (web)

Links
- Journal homepage

Fluid Dynamics is a bimonthly/monthly peer-reviewed scientific journal covering all fields of fluid dynamics. It was established in 1966 by Springer Science+Business Media. The editor-in-chief is Sergei T. Surzhikov (Institute for Problems in Mechanics of the Russian Academy of Sciences). According to the Journal Citation Reports, the journal has a 2024 impact factor of 0.6.
