= Jürgen Schmitt (artist) =

German painter

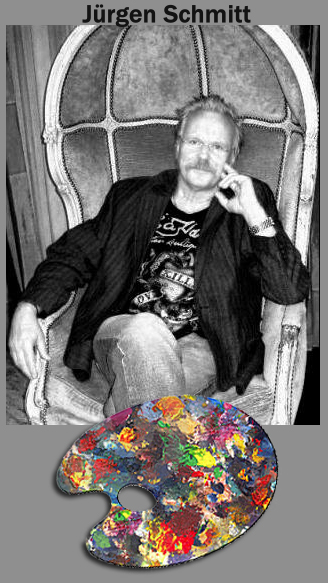
Juergen Schmitt

Jürgen Schmitt alias Schmitti (born 5 November 1949 in Bonn) is a German painter, photographer, and as "Schmitti", a composer, lyricist and Schlager-singer. He lives and works in the village of Scheven (population ca. 560) (Kall, North Rhine-Westphalia) and there he has his studios. Schmitt studied from 1970 to 1976 at the Art Academy in Düsseldorf under Professor Joseph Beuys and Professor Irmin Kamp and he was appointed in 1975 for his artistic achievements "Meister Schüler". He had many exhibitions in Germany and abroad.

== Discography ==
=== Singles ===
- 1997: Let's Rock im Karneval
- 2006: Wooly Bully – Volle Pulle
- 2007: Schatz – Mer fiere Fastelovend
- 2008: Du, Du liegst mir im Herzen
- 2008: Immer wenn ich traurig bin, trink ich einen Korn
- 2008: Himmlisch jeck
- 2009: En Kölle jebütz
- 2009: Weihnachten
- 2009: Jetzt geht es los
- 2009: Laola
- 2010: Ganz schön blau
- 2010: Die Sonne und Du
- 2010: Jetzt lass uns mal schunkeln
- 2011: Du bist meine Nummer 1
- 2011: Mallorca Ole Ola
- 2011: Ein bisschen Spaß muss sein
- 2012: Küss mich einmal, küss mich zweimal, feat. Helga Brauer
- 2012: En Kölle un am Zuckerhot (Mottolied)
- 2013: 1000 Küsse
- 2013: Die geile Raupe Nimmersatt
- 2014: Überall blühen Rosen Gilbert-Becaud-Coverversion & Sweety Peter Kraus-Coverversion
- 2014: Fußball-Deutschland stark wie nie
- 2014: D’r Zoch kütt
- 2015: Mallorca ist so schön, Coverversion, Ballermann-Hit nach Frank Zanders Marlene
- 2016: Jetzt ist es aus / (Unplugged and acoustic)
- 2016 Ein Prosit der Gemütlichkeit Remix und Geburtstagsständchen

=== Albums ===
- 2010: Volle Pulle! Die Mallorca- und Karneval-Party
