= Stephen E. Nagler =

Canadian-American physicist

Stephen E. Nagler is a Canadian condensed matter and materials science physicist. Nagler is the Corporate Research Fellow of the Oak Ridge National Laboratory (ORNL) and the Director of the laboratory's Quantum Condensed Matter Division. He is an adjunct professor with the Department of Physics at the University of Tennessee.

Nagler’s primary research interest is in condensed matter physics, especially quantum materials. He contributed to neutron scattering techniques, especially inelastic scattering to investigate the dynamics of materials. Nagler also worked with high resolution and time resolved x-ray scattering methods, using both in-house and synchrotron based x-ray sources.

Nagler contributed to the study of excitation (magnetic) and critical behavior (quantum) in materials science, as well as the study of non-equilibrium thermodynamics systems, quantum fluctuations, spin gap systems, and excitations in condensed matter.

== Education ==
Nagler received a B.S., M.S., and Ph.D. degrees in physics from the University of Toronto. He served two years as a visiting scientist at the IBM T. J. Watson Research Center, Yorktown Heights, New York, and joined the physics faculty at the University of Florida in 1984.

== Career ==
In 1984, at the University of Florida, Nagler initiated a research program using both time-resolved X-ray scattering and neutron scattering, and he was a founding member of the MRCAT beamline at the Advanced Photon Source, located in Argonne, Illinois. Nagler joined the former Solid State Physics Division’s Neutron scattering Group in 1995 and served as group leader for Neutron spectrometry from 1996 to 2005.

At Oak Ridge his primary research interests have been quantum magnetism and correlated electron systems. Nagler served as the interim director of the High Flux Isotope Reactor (HFIR) for Neutron scattering in 2005–2006, guiding the center through a critical DOE review while ensuring research productivity, successful instrument upgrades, and integration of neutron scattering at the HFIR and at the Spallation Neutron Source.

== Awards and honors ==
- Presidential Young Investigator, National Science Foundation (1986).
- Oak Ridge National Laboratory Scientist of the Year
- Fellow of the American Physical Society (2000)
- Corporate Research Fellow of the Oak Ridge National Laboratory, for contributions to the study of non-equilibrium thermodynamics systems, quantum magnetism, and excitations in condensed matter (2007)
- UT-Battelle Team Award for Outstanding Scientific Research, 2009.

Nagler serves on numerous national and international committees and was a member of the editorial board of Physical Review Letters.
