= Beverley McKeon =

Physicist and aerospace engineer

Beverley J. McKeon is a physicist and aerospace engineer specializing in fluid dynamics, and in particular in turbulent flows near walls. She was Theodore von Kármán Professor of Aeronautics at the California Institute of Technology. Currently she is a professor in the Department of Mechanical Engineering at Stanford University.

== Education and career ==
McKeon is originally from the Surrey, England, the daughter of a flight engineer. She earned bachelor's and master's degrees at the University of Cambridge in 1995 and 1996, respectively. She went to Princeton University for graduate study in mechanical and aerospace engineering, earning a second master's degree in 1999 and completing her Ph.D. in 2003, under the supervision of Alexander Smits.

After postdoctoral research as a Royal Society Dorothy Hodgkin Research Fellow at Imperial College London, she joined the California Institute of Technology faculty in 2006. She was promoted to professor in 2011 and was named von Kármán Professor in 2017.

== Recognition ==
In 2016, McKeon was named a Fellow of the American Physical Society (APS), after a nomination by the APS Division of Fluid Dynamics, "for experimental and theoretical contributions to advancing the understanding of wall turbulence and for elegant interdisciplinary approaches to modeling and flow manipulation". In 2020, she became a Fellow of the American Institute of Aeronautics and Astronautics.
