= Caroline Willard Baldwin =

American physicist (1869–1928)

- Born: June 30, 1869; San Francisco, California, U.S.
- Died: January 31, 1928 (aged 58); San Francisco, California, U.S.
- Education: University of California, B.S. 1892; Cornell University, Sc.D. 1895
- Spouse: Charles Theobald Morrison (m. 1898)
- Children: 2
- Scientific career
- Workplaces: California School of Mechanical Arts
- Thesis: A Photographic Study of Arc Spectra (1895)
- Doctoral advisor: Edward L. Nichols

Caroline Willard Baldwin (June 30, 1869 – January 31, 1928) was a physicist, known for being the first woman to earn a doctoral degree in physics from Cornell University, and one of the first women to earn a doctoral degree in physics from any United States institution.

== Career ==
Caroline Willard Baldwin was born on June 30, 1869, in San Francisco to Alfred Baldwin and Fannie Willard. She received her primary education from her mother and the Santa Cruz, California public schools.

Baldwin attended the University of California, earning a B.S. in 1892. She was the first woman to graduate from the College of Mechanics at Berkeley. Baldwin placed third in her graduating class and spoke at the commencement.

Baldwin conducted her graduate studies under Edward L. Nichols at Cornell University. She earned an Sc.D. from Cornell in 1895. This was the first doctoral degree in physics awarded to a woman by Cornell, and one of the first among all U.S. institutions. Baldwin published her thesis in 1896 in Physical Review.

From 1895 to 1900, Baldwin taught physics at the California School of Mechanical Arts, a secondary school in San Francisco. In 1898 she coauthored with Arthur Merrill a textbook entitled Physics Course of the California School of Mechanical Arts.

== Personal life ==
Baldwin married Charles Theobald Morrison in 1898. They had two children, Frances and George. Baldwin died in 1928.
