= Energy Citations Database =

United States Department of Energy database

- Producer: United States Department of Energy - Office of Scientific and Technical Information (United States)
- History: 2001–present
- Languages: English

Access
- Providers: Regional Federal Depository Libraries
- Cost: Free

Coverage
- Disciplines: Multidisciplinary science
- Record depth: full text, bibliographic citation, title, creator/author, subject, identifier numbers, publication date, system entry date, resource/document type, research organization, sponsoring organization, and/or combinations thereof
- Format coverage: citations of literature, citations to report literature, conference papers, journal articles, books, dissertations, and patents.
- Temporal coverage: 1943–present
- Geospatial coverage: North America
- No. of records: 2.6 million +
- Update frequency: regular

Links
- Website: www.osti.gov/energycitations/index.jsp
- Title list(s): www.osti.gov/energycitations/availability.jsp

The Energy Citations Database (ECD) was created in 2001 in order to make scientific literature citations, and electronic documents, publicly accessible from U.S. Department of Energy (DOE), and its predecessor agencies, at no cost to the user. This database also contains all the unclassified materials from Energy Research Abstracts. Classified materials are not available to the public. ECD does include the unclassified, unlimited distribution scientific and technical reports from the Department of Energy and its predecessor agencies, the Atomic Energy Commission and the Energy Research and Development Administration. The database is usually updated twice per week.

ECD provides free access to over 2.6 million science research citations with continued growth through regular updates. There are over 221,000 electronic documents, primarily from 1943 forward, available via the database. Citations and documents are made publicly available by the Regional Federal Depository Libraries. These institutions maintain and make available DOE research literature, providing access to non‑electronic documents prior to 1994, and electronic access to more recent documents.

ECD was created and developed by DOE's Office of Scientific and Technical Information with the science-attentive citizen in mind. It contains energy and energy‑related scientific and technical information collected by the DOE and its predecessor agencies.

== Scope ==
Topics, or subjects, and Department of Energy disciplines of interest in Energy Citations Database (ECD) are wide-ranging. Scientific and technical research encompass chemistry, physics, materials, environmental science, geology, engineering, mathematics, climatology, oceanography, computer science, and related disciplines. It includes bibliographic citations to report scientific literature, conference papers, journal articles, books, dissertations, and patents.

=== Stated capabilities ===
Bibliographic citations for scientific and technical information dating from 1943 to the present day. Search capabilities include full text, bibliographic citation, title, creator/author, subject, identifier numbers, publication date, system entry date, resource/document type, research organization, sponsoring organization, and/or any combination of these.

Commensurate with the above search capabilities is sorting results by various means. Results can be sorted by relevance, publication date, system entry date, resource/document type, title, research organization, sponsoring organization, or the unique Office of Scientific Information (OSTI) Identifier. Furthermore, acquiring a count of search results, combined with a link to the actual results is available.

- ability to receive weekly Alerts in topics of interest;
- information about acquiring a non-electronic document

== Research and database in predecessor agencies ==
Since the late 1940s, the Office of Scientific and Technical Information (OSTI) and its predecessor organizations have been responsible for the management of scientific and technical information (STI) for the Department of Energy (DOE) and its predecessor agencies, the Atomic Energy Commission (AEC) and the Energy Research and Development Administration (ERDA). Growth and development of STI management has incorporated planning, developing, maintaining, and administering all services and facilities required to accomplish the dissemination of scientific and technical information for the encouragement of scientific progress.

=== Atomic Energy Commission ===
In 1942, the Manhattan Project was established by the United States Army to conduct atomic research with the goal of ending World War II. This research was performed in a manner that helped to cement the ongoing bond between basic scientific research and national security. After the war, the authority to continue this research was transferred from the Army to the United States Atomic Energy Commission (AEC) through the Atomic Energy Act of 1946. This Act was signed into law by President Harry S. Trumanun on August 1, 1946, and entrusted the AEC with the government monopoly in the field of atomic research and development.

=== Energy Reorganization Act ===
The Energy Reorganization Act of 1974 abolished the Atomic Energy Commission and established the Energy Research and Development Administration (ERDA). ERDA was created to achieve two goals:

First was to focus the Federal Government's energy research and development activities within a unified agency whose major function would be to promote the speedy development of various energy technologies. The second, was to separate nuclear licensing and regulatory functions from the development and production of nuclear power and weapons.

=== Department of Energy ===
To achieve a major Federal energy reorganization, the Department of Energy (DOE) was activated on October 1, 1977. DOE became the twelfth cabinet-level department in the Federal Government and brought together for the first time most of the government's energy programs and defense responsibilities that included the design, construction, and testing of nuclear weapons.

== Features section ==
The Energy Citations Database features noteworthy topics of discussion in the features section.

=== SciDAC ===
SciDAC is a specially designed program within the Office of Science of the U.S. Department of Energy. It enables scientific discovery through advanced computing (SciDAC), and is driven by a spirit of collaboration. Discipline scientists, applied mathematicians, and computer scientists are working together to maximize use of the most sophisticated high-power computers for scientific discovery. Research results are promulgated through the SciDAC review magazine. Supercomputer Modeling and Visualization is covered in the Spring 2010 issue of this magazine.

== Regional Federal Depository Libraries ==
Logo for a Federal Depository Library

There are nearly 1,250 depository libraries throughout the United States and its territories. Access to all documents (hundreds of thousands) is no-fee access. Expert assisted searches are available, on site.

Federal depository libraries have been established by Congress to ensure that the American public has access to its Government's information. The Federal Depository Library Program (FDLP) involves the acquisition, format conversion, and distribution of depository materials to libraries throughout the United States and the coordination of Federal depository libraries in the 50 states, the District of Columbia and U.S. territories.

The U.S. Government Printing Office administers the FDLP.

=== Federal depository library coverage ===
Coverage generally encompasses:

- Health and Nutrition
- Laws, Statistics, and Presidential Materials
- Science and Technology
- Business and Careers
- Education
- History
- World Maps

Available formats are publications, journals, electronic resources, microfiche, microfilm and various other formats encompassing hundreds of thousands of topics.
