= SPIN bibliographic database =

SPIN (Searchable Physics Information Notices)
- Producer: American Institute of Physics (AIP) (USA, Russia, Ukraine)
- Languages: English, Russian, Ukrainian

Access
- Providers: Dialog, AIP website, SPIE Digital Library

Coverage
- Disciplines: Physics, Astronomy, Mathematics, Geophysics, Geosciences, Nuclear Science, Science & Technology
- Record depth: Word, Phrase, Abstract, Author and Author affiliations, Descriptor, Errata (coden, or date, or volume) Identifier, Title, Astronomical objects, CODEN, Conference (location, or title, or year), Journal name, and more...
- Format coverage: Journal Articles, Book Reviews, Conferences, Meetings, Patents, Symposia
- Temporal coverage: 1975 to the present
- Geospatial coverage: International
- No. of records: over 1.5 million
- Update frequency: Weekly

Print edition
- Print title: No print counterparts

Links
- Website: scitation.aip.org/jhtml/scitation/coverage.jsp

SPIN (Searchable Physics Information Notices) bibliographic database is an indexing and abstracting service produced by the American Institute of Physics (AIP). The content focus of SPIN is described as the most significant areas of physics research. This type of literature coverage spans the major physical science journals and magazines. Major conference proceedings that are reported by the American Institute of Physics, member societies, as well as affiliated organizations are also included as part of this database. References, or citations, provide access to more than 1.5 million articles as of 2010. SPIN has no print counterpart.

== Journals ==
Delivery of timely indexing and abstracting is for, what are deemed to be, the significant or important physics and astronomy journals from the United States, Russia, and Ukraine. Citations for journal articles are derived from original publications of the AIP, which includes published translated works. At the same time, citations are included from member societies, and selectively chosen American journals. Citations become typically available online on the same date as the corresponding journal article.

== Sources ==
Overall, the source citations are derived from material published by the AIP and member societies, which are English-speaking, Russian, and Ukrainian journals and conference proceedings. Certain American physics-related articles are also sources of citations. About 60 journals have cover to cover indexing, and about 100 journals, overall, are indexed.

== Scope ==
Subject coverage encompasses the following:

- Applied physics, Electromagnetic technology, Microelectronics
- Atomic physics and Molecular physics
- Biological physics and Medical physics
- Classical physics and Quantum physics
- Condensed matter physics
- Elementary particle physics
- General physics, Optics, Acoustics, and Fluid dynamics
- Geophysics, Astronomy, Astrophysics
- Materials science
- Nuclear physics
- Plasma physics
- Physical chemistry

== See also ==
- List of academic databases and search engines
