= Quantum Aspects of Life =

2008 book by various authors

- Author: Derek Abbott, Paul C. W. Davies, Arun K. Pati (Eds.); With foreword by Sir Roger Penrose
- Language: English
- Subject: Physics and biophysics
- Genre: Nonfiction; science text
- Publisher: Imperial College Press
- Publication date: 2008
- Publication place: United Kingdom
- Media type: Print
- Pages: 581 pp.
- ISBN: 978-1848162532

Quantum Aspects of Life, a book published in 2008 with a foreword by Roger Penrose, explores the open question of the role of quantum mechanics at molecular scales of relevance to biology. It contains chapters written by various world experts from a 2003 symposium and includes two debates from 2003 to 2004, giving rise to a mix of both sceptical and sympathetic viewpoints. The book addresses questions of quantum physics, biophysics, nanoscience, quantum chemistry, mathematical biology, complexity theory, and philosophy that are inspired by the 1944 seminal book What Is Life? by Erwin Schrödinger.

== Contents ==
- Foreword by Roger Penrose

Section 1: Emergence and Complexity

- Chapter 1: "A Quantum Origin of Life?" by Paul C. W. Davies
- Chapter 2: "Quantum Mechanics and Emergence" by Seth Lloyd

Section 2: Quantum Mechanisms in Biology

- Chapter 3: "Quantum Coherence and the Search for the First Replicator" by Jim Al-Khalili and Johnjoe McFadden
- Chapter 4: "Ultrafast Quantum Dynamics in Photosynthesis" by Alexandra Olaya-Castro, Francesca Fassioli Olsen, Chiu Fan Lee, and Neil F. Johnson
- Chapter 5: "Modeling Quantum Decoherence in Biomolecules" by Jacques Bothma, Joel Gilmore, and Ross H. McKenzie

Section 3: The Biological Evidence

- Chapter 6: "Molecular Evolution: A Role for Quantum Mechanics in the Dynamics of Molecular Machines that Read and Write DNA" by Anita Goel
- Chapter 7: "Memory Depends on the Cytoskeleton, but is it Quantum?" by Andreas Mershin and Dimitri V. Nanopoulos
- Chapter 8: "Quantum Metabolism and Allometric Scaling Relations in Biology" by Lloyd Demetrius
- Chapter 9: "Spectroscopy of the Genetic Code" by Jim D. Bashford and Peter D. Jarvis
- Chapter 10: "Towards Understanding the Origin of Genetic Languages" by Apoorva D. Patel

Section 4: Artificial Quantum Life

- Chapter 11: "Can Arbitrary Quantum Systems Undergo Self-Replication?" by Arun K. Pati and Samuel L. Braunstein
- Chapter 12: "A Semi-Quantum Version of the Game of Life" by Adrian P. Flitney and Derek Abbott
- Chapter 13: "Evolutionary Stability in Quantum Games" by Azhar Iqbal and Taksu Cheon
- Chapter 14: "Quantum Transmemetic Intelligence" by Edward W. Piotrowski and Jan Sładkowski

Section 5: The Debate

- Chapter 15: "Dreams versus Reality: Plenary Debate Session on Quantum Computing" For panel: Carlton M. Caves, Daniel Lidar, Howard Brandt, Alexander R. Hamilton; Against panel: David K. Ferry, Julio Gea-Banacloche, Sergey M. Bezrukov, Laszlo B. Kish; Debate chair: Charles R. Doering; Transcript Editor: Derek Abbott.
- Chapter 16: "Plenary Debate: Quantum Effects in Biology: Trivial or Not?" For panel: Paul C. W. Davies, Stuart Hameroff, Anton Zeilinger, Derek Abbott; Against panel: Jens Eisert, Howard M. Wiseman, Sergey M. Bezrukov, Hans Frauenfelder; Debate chair: Julio Gea-Banacloche; Transcript Editor: Derek Abbott.
- Chapter 17: "Non-trivial Quantum Effects in Biology: A Skeptical Physicist's View" Howard M. Wiseman and Jens Eisert
- Chapter 18: "That's Life! — The Geometry of π Electron Clouds" Stuart Hameroff

== See also ==
- Quantum biology
