= Sergey Bezrukov (biophysicist) =

American biophysicist

Sergey M. Bezrukov
- Education: Saint Petersburg Polytechnical University; Moscow State University
- Known for: Stochastic resonance Ion channels Noise-based brain logic
- Scientific career
- Fields: Biophysicist
- Workplaces: St. Petersburg Nuclear Physics Institute; National Institutes of Health
- Doctoral advisor: Giliary Moiseevich Drabkin

Sergey M. Bezrukov is a Russian born biophysicist notable for his work on ion channels and stochastic resonance.

== Education ==
He received his MS in Electronics and Theoretical Physics from Saint Petersburg Polytechnical University, 1973; and he obtained his PhD under Giliary Moiseevich Drabkin in Physics and Mathematics from Moscow State University, Russia, 1981.

== Career ==
During 1981-87, he was a research scientist, Leningrad Nuclear Physics Institute, Laboratory of Condensed Matter Physics; in 1987-90 a senior research scientist, Leningrad Nuclear Physics Institute, Laboratory of Condensed Matter Physics; in 1990-92 he was a visiting research associate, University of Maryland, College Park and special volunteer, National Institutes of Health, LBM, NIDDK; in 1992-98 he was visiting scientist, National Institutes of Health, LSB, DCRT and LPSB, NICHD; in 1998-02 he was an investigator, head of unit, National Institutes of Health, LPSB, NICHD. He took up his present position in 2002, as section chief in the Laboratory of Physical and Structural Biology, National Institutes of Health, Bethesda, Maryland.

== Honors ==
Bezrukov was elected Member of executive council of the Division of Biological Physics of the American Physical Society in 2002.

== See also ==
- Lipid membranes
- Noise-based logic
- SEPTIC bacterium detection/identification method
- Quantum Aspects of Life (book)
- Stochastic Resonance (book)
