= Andreas Mershin =

American physicist

- Education: Imperial College; Texas A&M University
- Known for: Biophysics of the cytoskeleton, Biological photovoltaics
- Scientific career
- Fields: Biophysicist
- Workplaces: MIT
- Doctoral advisor: Dimitri V. Nanopoulos

Andreas Mershin is a physicist who led the MIT Label Free Research Group at the Center for Bits and Atoms, Massachusetts Institute of Technology, from 2004 to 2023. He continues to teach at MIT Sloan and is the co-founder and Chief Science Officer of RealNose.ai (https://www.RealNose.ai/), a company specializing in advanced machine olfaction technologies, such as their first product, a non-invasive diagnostic tool for early prostate cancer detection claiming canine-like diagnostic abilities.

== Education ==
He received his MSci in physics from Imperial College London (1997) and his PhD in physics from Texas A&M University (2003), under Dimitri V. Nanopoulos, where he studied the theoretical and experimental biophysics of the cytoskeleton. He performed molecular dynamic simulations on tubulin. Under an NSF grant he conducted cross-disciplinary research that experimented with surface plasmon resonance, dielectric spectroscopy and molecular neurobiology. Mershin tested the hypothesis that the neuronal microtubular cytoskeleton is involved in memory encoding, storage, and retrieval in Drosophila.

== Career ==
Mershin researches bio- and nano- materials at the Center for Bits and Atoms at MIT, where he develops bioelectronic photovoltaic and machine olfaction applications using membrane proteins integrated onto semiconductors. Mershin has patented in the field of bioenergy harvesters, he is also a co-founder of the Royal Swedish Academy of Sciences' international annual "Molecular Frontiers Inquiry Prize" for the best scientific question posed by children.

He is also the co-founder and Chief Science Officer of RealNose.ai (http://www.RealNose.ai), a company developing advanced machine olfaction technologies inspired by the olfactory capabilities of trained dogs. RealNose.ai specializes in creating non-invasive diagnostic tools, currently focusing applications for early prostate cancer detection.

Mershin's work has been featured in publications such as PLoS One, MIT News, and Wired. He has also appeared on QED with Dr. B and delivered two TEDx talks highlighting his research in machine olfaction and bio-nano materials.

== See also ==
- Quantum Aspects of Life (book)
