= Taksu Cheon =

Japanese physicist

- Born: 1958 (age 67–68); Kyoto, Japan
- Education: University of Tokyo
- Known for: Quantum game theory
- Scientific career
- Fields: Physicist
- Workplaces: Kochi University of Technology; University of Tokyo; Osaka University; University of Maryland, College Park
- Doctoral advisor: Akito Arima

Taksu Cheon (全 卓樹, Zen Tasuku; born 1958) is a Japanese physicist notable for his work on quantum game theory and the foundations of quantum mechanics.

== Education ==
He graduated from Kunitachi High School, in 1976. He obtained his BSc, 1980, his MSc, 1982, and PhD, under Akito Arima, 1985, all from the University of Tokyo. His PhD thesis topic was in the area of theoretical nuclear physics.

== Career ==
In 1985, he was a Yukawa Research Associate at Osaka University. In 1986, he was a Visiting Assistant Professor at the University of Georgia and in 1987 he was a research associate at the University of Maryland, College Park. In 1989, he was appointed as an INS Research Associate at the University of Tokyo. Presently he is Professor of Theoretical Physics at the Kochi University of Technology, Japan.

== See also ==
- Quantum Aspects of Life
