= Nigel G. Stocks =

British engineer (born 1964)

- Born: 6 September 1964 (age 62); Bradford, West Yorkshire, UK
- Education: Lancaster University
- Known for: SSR
- Scientific career
- Fields: Physicist
- Workplaces: University of Warwick
- Doctoral advisor: Peter V. E. McClintock
- Notable students: Mark D. McDonnell

Nigel Geoffrey Stocks (born 6 September 1964) is an English engineer and physicist, notable for discovering suprathreshold stochastic resonance (SSR) and its application to cochlear implant technology.

== Education ==
He attended Bingley Grammar School before received a BSc in Applied Physics and Electronics (1987) and a PhD in (1991), under Peter V. E. McClintock, at Lancaster University, UK, with a dissertation entitled Experiments in Stochastic Nonlinear Dynamics.

== Selected publication ==
- Mark D. McDonnell, Nigel G. Stocks, Charles E. M. Pearce, and Derek Abbott, Stochastic Resonance, Cambridge University Press, 2008, ISBN 978-0-521-88262-0.

== See also ==
- Stochastic resonance
