= Stochastic Resonance (book) =

Science textbook by Mark D. McDonnell

- Author: Mark D. McDonnell, Nigel G. Stocks, Charles E. M. Pearce, & Derek Abbott.
- Language: English
- Subject: Physics, biophysics, computational neuroscience, engineering
- Genre: Non-fiction; science text
- Publisher: Cambridge University Press
- Publication date: 2008
- Publication place: United Kingdom
- Pages: 448
- ISBN: 978-0-521-88262-0

Stochastic Resonance: From Suprathreshold Stochastic Resonance to Stochastic Signal Quantization is a science text, with a foreword by Sergey M. Bezrukov and Bart Kosko, which notably explores the relationships between stochastic resonance, suprathreshold stochastic resonance, stochastic quantization, and computational neuroscience. The book critically evaluates the field of stochastic resonance, considers various constraints and trade-offs in the performance of stochastic quantizers, culminating in a chapter on the application of suprathreshold stochastic resonance to the design of cochlear implants. The book also discusses, in detail, the relationship between dithering and stochastic resonance.

== Reception ==
The book has received a favorable book review in the journal Contemporary Physics in 2009.

== See also ==
- Stochastic resonance
- Suprathreshold stochastic resonance
