= Peter Heszler =

Hungarian physicist

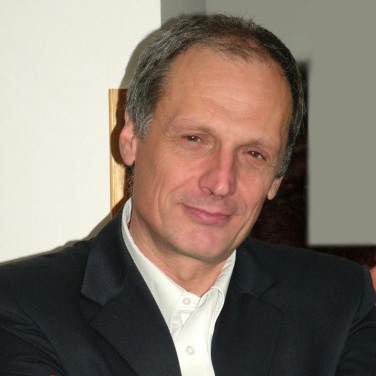
- Peter Heszler (1958-2009)
- Born: 1 November 1958; Miskolc, Hungary
- Died: 15 August 2009 (aged 50); Szeged, Hungary
- Citizenship: Hungarian
- Education: University of Szeged; University of Uppsala
- Known for: thermal radiation of nanoparticles
- Scientific career
- Fields: Physicist
- Workplaces: University of Uppsala
- Academic advisors: Jan-Otto Carlsson; Claes-Göran Granqvist

Peter Heszler (November 1, 1958, Miskolc – August 15, 2009, Szeged) was a Hungarian physicist. He is well known for, among others, his research on laser-assisted nanoparticle synthesis. His research included nanotechnology, condensed matter physics, materials science, fluctuations and noise, laser science and chemical sensors, including fluctuation-enhanced sensing.

One of his early famous papers was the exact denial of a non-existing phenomenon called quantum 1/f noise. The denial was based on quantum electrodynamics and proved that the quantum 1/f noise effect does not exist and its theoretical model is incorrect. In the quantum 1/f noise model, the photons and their vacuum states were omitted from the equations and such errors yielded faulty mathematical predictions for fluctuations that cannot exist because they are forbidden by the basic orthogonality rules of quantum electrodynamics.

His most important breakthroughs include the discovery and application of emission of thermal radiation from nanoparticles during laser-assisted synthesis. The time dependent spectral analysis of this radiation offers a powerful tool to study the chemical reactions and their dynamics during laser-assisted nanoparticle fabrication.

== Career ==
Peter Heszler's PhD is from the University of Szeged, Hungary (1988). His habilitation (Docent) degree is from University of Uppsala, Sweden (1994). Most of his scientific results were achieved at these two places. During his last years, he was Senior Research Fellow at Szeged and Associate Professor at Uppsala. Out of science and technology, he was also interested in the history and culture of the interrelation of science and religion, and he held a related course about that at the University of Szeged.

== Publications by Heszler ==
- Proc. SPIE Fluctuations and Noise in Photonics and Quantum Optics II, Vol. 5468, (Ed. Peter Heszler), Maspalomas, Spain, May 26–28 May 2004, ISBN 9780819453914.
