= Stochastic resonance =

Signal boosting phenomenon using white noise

Stochastic resonance (SR) is a mathematical mechanism and behavior of nonlinear systems (that is, systems in which the change of the output is not proportional to the change of the input) where random (stochastic) fluctuations in the microstate of a system (that is, its specific configuration, including the precise positions and momenta of all its individual particles or components) cause deterministic (that is, non-random) changes in a macrostate (that is, a subset of the system's microstates).

This occurs when the nonlinear nature of the system amplifies certain (resonant) portions of the fluctuations, while not amplifying other portions of the noise. The nonlinear system, immersed in a certain level of stochastic background noise, becomes sensitive to external perturbations that would be too weak to influence it in the absence of such noise.

Originally proposed in the context of climate dynamics, over time it has become important in numerous fields that study a wide variety of systems, particularly in information theory and in neuroscience. Phenomena attributable to stochastic resonance have also been observed in other types of physical systems, such as chemical reactions, quantum systems, and industrial processes. Stochastic resonance is also closely related to the concept of dithering in signal analysis, although how similar or how different the two concepts are depends on the particular definition considered.

Stochastic resonance was discovered and proposed for the first time in 1981 to explain the periodic recurrence of ice ages. Nowadays stochastic resonance is commonly invoked when noise and nonlinearity concur to determine an increase of order in a system's response.

See the Review of Modern Physics article "Stochastic resonance" for a comprehensive overview of stochastic resonance.

== History ==
The mechanism of stochastic resonance was first described in the early 1980s by the Italian physicists Roberto Benzi, Alfonso Sutera, and Angelo Vulpiani, who (with the additional participation of Giorgio Parisi) immediately applied it to climatology, in order to explain how small variations in the motion of the Earth (the so-called Milankovitch cycles) can cause large variations in the Earth's climate (in particular, the transition from glacial periods to interglacial periods, and vice versa). According to Parisi's account, the name "stochastic resonance" was coined by Benzi during a conference. At the same time, a very similar explanation was also proposed by the Belgian physicist Catherine Nicolis.

An initial experimental verification was found as early as 1983 in a bistable electronic circuit, and in 1988 in a laser system. In the early 1990s, the first works appeared in which it was hypothesized that stochastic resonance played an important role in neuronal dynamics, a concept now confirmed.

== Climatological interpretation ==
In the original works of Benzi, Parisi, Sutera, and Vulpiani, the potential depending on the Earth's mean temperature (i.e., the variable corresponding to $x$) was linked to the albedo of the Earth, that is, the fraction of incoming solar radiation that is reflected back into space rather than absorbed by the planet. It depends on numerous factors closely related to the Earth's climate, the main ones being the extent of the ice sheets and cloud cover. In general it was assumed that the albedo tends to a maximum both for extremely low temperatures (since the planet would be completely covered by highly reflective ice) and for high temperatures (since high temperature is associated with high evaporation, and therefore with extensive cloud cover, which is also reflective), while the two stable states of minimum albedo were associated with glacial periods and interglacial periods.

== Information theory ==
In information theory, SR can be used to reveal weak signals. When a signal that is normally too weak to be detected by a sensor can be boosted by adding white noise to the signal, which contains a wide spectrum of frequencies. The frequencies in the white noise corresponding to the original signal's frequencies will resonate with each other, amplifying the original signal while not amplifying the rest of the white noise – thereby increasing the signal-to-noise ratio, which makes the original signal more prominent. Further, the added white noise can be enough to be detectable by the sensor, which can then filter it out to effectively detect the original, previously undetectable signal.

This phenomenon of boosting undetectable signals by resonating with added white noise extends to many other systems – whether electromagnetic, physical or biological – and is an active area of research.

== Technical description ==
Stochastic resonance (SR) is observed when noise added to a system changes the system's behaviour in some fashion. More technically, SR occurs if the signal-to-noise ratio of a nonlinear system or device increases for moderate values of noise intensity. It often occurs in bistable systems or in systems with a sensory threshold and when the input signal to the system is "sub-threshold." For lower noise intensities, the signal does not cause the device to cross threshold, so little signal is passed through it. For large noise intensities, the output is dominated by the noise, also leading to a low signal-to-noise ratio. For moderate intensities, the noise allows the signal to reach threshold, but the noise intensity is not so large as to swamp it. Thus, a plot of signal-to-noise ratio as a function of noise intensity contains a peak.

Strictly speaking, stochastic resonance occurs in bistable systems, when a small periodic (sinusoidal) force is applied together with a large wide band stochastic force (noise). The system response is driven by the combination of the two forces that compete/cooperate to make the system switch between the two stable states. The degree of order is related to the amount of periodic function that it shows in the system response. When the periodic force is chosen small enough in order to not make the system response switch, the presence of a non-negligible noise is required for it to happen. When the noise is small, very few switches occur, mainly at random with no significant periodicity in the system response. When the noise is very strong, a large number of switches occur for each period of the sinusoid, and the system response does not show remarkable periodicity. Between these two conditions, there exists an optimal value of the noise that cooperatively concurs with the periodic forcing in order to make almost exactly one switch per period (a maximum in the signal-to-noise ratio).

Such a favorable condition is quantitatively determined by the matching of two timescales: the period of the sinusoid (the deterministic time scale) and the Kramers rate (i.e., the average switch rate induced by the sole noise: the inverse of the stochastic time scale).

== Simplified model ==
Generic shape of the potential $U(x)$

Below is a didactic toy model capable of capturing the essential aspects of the stochastic resonance mechanism.

=== Starting equation ===
Consider a time-dependent physical variable $x(t)$ (which, in the original climate papers, was the mean temperature of the Earth), described by a stochastic differential equation of the Langevin equation type:

$$\frac{dx}{dt} = - \frac{\partial U}{\partial x} + f(t) + \epsilon \cos(\omega t),$$

where $U(x)$ is a potential function determining the system dynamics, $f(t)$ is a stochastic forcing corresponding to background noise, and $\epsilon \cos(\omega t)$ is the external periodic perturbation, of small amplitude ($\epsilon \ll 1$), which in the climate studies corresponded to the Milankovitch cycles. It is assumed that $U(x)$ has a double-well shape (describable by a fourth-degree polynomial), i.e., it possesses two stable minima $x_-$ and $x_+$ (glacial and interglacial periods) separated by an unstable maximum $x_0$, corresponding to a potential barrier $\Delta U$ (for simplicity it is assumed that the two minima lie at the same level $U(x_{\pm})$). For $f(t)$ the simplest possible form is considered, namely that of Gaussian noise, with zero mean and Dirac delta correlation: $\langle f(t) \rangle = 0$ and $\langle f(t_1)f(t_2) \rangle = 2D \delta (t_2-t_1)$.

In the absence of periodic perturbations ($\epsilon = 0$), it is well known from the theory of Markov processes that the variable $x(t)$ will fluctuate around the minimum points, with a variance proportional to the Gaussian noise intensity $D$. Occasionally the fluctuations will be strong enough to allow crossing of the potential barrier, and therefore the transition from one minimum state to the other. In the limit $D \ll \Delta U$, the mean transition frequency is given by the so-called Kramers formula:

$$r_{\pm}= \frac{1}{2\pi} \sqrt{-U^{''} (x_0)U^{''}(x_{\pm})} e^{-\frac{\Delta U}{D}},$$
where $U^{''}(x)$ is the second derivative of $U(x)$.

=== Stochastic resonance ===
In the presence of periodic perturbations, the potential $U$ is replaced by the generalized potential $W(x,t) = U(x) - \epsilon \cos\omega t$. This means that the two potential wells vary in height, rising and falling, and therefore the barrier that the system must overcome to jump from one minimum to the other will at some moments be higher and at others lower. However, the oscillations are of small amplitude, so they are not able to completely remove the barrier and thus allow the system to transition between states on their own: the idea of stochastic resonance is that, if the perturbation frequency $\omega$ is in some way comparable with the mean transition frequency $r_{\pm}$, then the random fluctuations of the system will tend to synchronize with the external oscillations, making the transition more likely.

Using the explicit form of the potential $U(x) = - \frac{1}{2} x^2 + \frac{1}{4} x^4$, it can be shown that, at least to first order approximation, the mean value of $x(t)$ becomes a periodic function of time with the same frequency as the external forcing:

$$\langle x(t) \rangle = A \cos(\omega t + \phi),$$

where the amplitude $A$ and the phase $\phi$ are given by the following relations:

Typical behavior of the amplitude $A$ as a function of the noise intensity $D$.

$$A = \frac{\epsilon \langle x^2\rangle_0}{D} \frac{2r_{\pm}}{\sqrt{r_{\pm}^2+\omega^2/4}}, \qquad \qquad \phi = - \arctan \left(\frac{\omega}{2r_{\pm}}\right);$$

with $\langle x^2 \rangle_0$ the variance of $x$ in the absence of external perturbations (dependent on the noise intensity $D$).

The fundamental aspects are therefore:

- the system oscillations tend, on average, to synchronize with the external perturbations;
- the amplification effect is negligible unless the perturbation frequency $\omega$ is comparable with the transition frequency $r_{\pm}$ (dependent on the noise intensity), and it is maximal for $\omega = 2r_{\pm}$;
- for fixed perturbation amplitude $\epsilon$ and frequency $\omega$, the amplitude $A$ is, for low noise intensities, a sharply increasing function of $D$, reaching a maximum peak at an intermediate noise level, and then becoming a decreasing function of $D$ for large noise values.

== Suprathreshold ==
Suprathreshold stochastic resonance is a particular form of stochastic resonance, in which random fluctuations, or noise, provide a signal processing benefit in a nonlinear system. Unlike most of the nonlinear systems in which stochastic resonance occurs, suprathreshold stochastic resonance occurs when the strength of the fluctuations is small relative to that of an input signal, or even small for random noise. It is not restricted to a subthreshold signal, hence the qualifier.

== Neuroscience, psychology and biology ==
Stochastic resonance has been observed in the neural tissue of the sensory systems of several organisms. Computationally, neurons exhibit SR because of non-linearities in their processing. SR has yet to be fully explained in biological systems, but neural synchrony or phase coherence in the brain (across a wide spectrum of frequencies including the gamma waveWinterer G, Ziller M, Dorn H, Frick K, Mulert C, Dahhan N, Herrmann WM, Coppola R. Cortical activation, signal-to-noise ratio and stochastic resonance during information processing in man. Clin Neurophysiol 1999 Jul;110(7):1193-203. doi: 10.1016/s1388-2457(99)00059-0. frequency) has been suggested as a possible neural mechanism for SR by researchers who have investigated the perception of "subconscious" visual sensation. Single neurons in vitro including cerebellar Purkinje cells and squid giant axon could also demonstrate the inverse stochastic resonance, when spiking is inhibited by synaptic noise of a particular variance.

== Medicine ==
SR-based techniques have been used to create a novel class of medical devices for enhancing sensory and motor functions such as vibrating insoles especially for the elderly, or patients with diabetic neuropathy or stroke.

Stochastic resonance has found noteworthy application in the field of image processing.

== Signal analysis ==
A related phenomenon is dithering, applied to analog signals before analog-to-digital conversion. Stochastic resonance can be used to measure transmittance amplitudes below an instrument's detection limit. If Gaussian noise is added to a subthreshold (i.e., immeasurable) signal, then it can be brought into a detectable region. After detection, the noise is removed. A fourfold improvement in the detection limit can be obtained.

== See also ==
- Mutual coherence (linear algebra)
- Signal detection theory
- Stochastic resonance (sensory neurobiology)

== Bibliography ==
- McDonnell MD, and Abbott D (2009). "What is Stochastic Resonance? Definitions, misconceptions, debates, and its relevance to biology". PLOS Computational Biology. 5 (5) e1000348. Bibcode:2009PLSCB...5E0348M. doi:10.1371/journal.pcbi.1000348. PMC 2660436. PMID 19562010.
- Gammaitoni L, Hänggi P, Jung P, Marchesoni F (2009). "Stochastic Resonance: A remarkable idea that changed our perception of noise". European Physical Journal B. 69 (1): 1–3. Bibcode:2009EPJB...69....1G. doi:10.1140/epjb/e2009-00163-x. S2CID 123073615.
- Peter Hänggi (March 2002). "Stochastic resonance in biology. How noise can enhance detection of weak signals and help improve biological information processing" (PDF). ChemPhysChem. 3 (3): 285–290. doi:10.1002/1439-7641(20020315)3:3<285::AID-CPHC285>3.0.CO;2-A. PMID 12503175.
- F. Chapeau-Blondeau; D. Rousseau (2009). "Raising the noise to improve performance in optimal processing". Journal of Statistical Mechanics: Theory and Experiment. 2009 (1) P01003. Bibcode:2009JSMTE..01..003C. doi:10.1088/1742-5468/2009/01/P01003. S2CID 7778013.
- J. C. Comte; et al. (2003). "Stochastic resonance: another way to retrieve subthreshold digital data". Physics Letters A. 309 (1): 39–43. Bibcode:2003PhLA..309...39C. doi:10.1016/S0375-9601(03)00166-X.
- Moss F, Ward LM, Sannita WG (February 2004). "Stochastic resonance and sensory information processing: a tutorial and review of application". Clin Neurophysiol. 115 (2): 267–81. doi:10.1016/j.clinph.2003.09.014. PMID 14744566. S2CID 4141064.
- Wiesenfeld K, Moss F (January 1995). "Stochastic resonance and the benefits of noise: from ice ages to crayfish and SQUIDs". Nature. 373 (6509): 33–6. Bibcode:1995Natur.373...33W. doi:10.1038/373033a0. PMID 7800036. S2CID 4287929.
- Bulsara A, Gammaitoni L (March 1996). "Tuning in to noise". Physics Today. 49 (3): 39–45. Bibcode:1996PhT....49c..39B. doi:10.1063/1.881491.
- F. Chapeau-Blondeau; D. Rousseau (2002). "Noise improvements in stochastic resonance: From signal amplification to optimal detection". Fluctuation and Noise Letters. 2 (3): L221–L233. doi:10.1142/S0219477502000798. S2CID 47951856.
- Priplata AA, Patritti BL, Niemi JB, et al. (January 2006). "Noise-enhanced balance control in patients with diabetes and patients with stroke". Ann. Neurol. 59 (1): 4–12. doi:10.1002/ana.20670. PMID 16287079. S2CID 3140340.
- Peter Hänggi; Peter Talkner; Michal Borkovec (1990). "Reaction-rate theory: fifty years after Kramers". Reviews of Modern Physics. 62 (2): 251–341. Bibcode:1990RvMP...62..251H. doi:10.1103/RevModPhys.62.251. S2CID 122573991.
- Hannes Risken The Fokker-Planck Equation, 2nd edition, Springer, 1989
- Wellens, Thomas; Shatokhin, Vyacheslav; Buchleitner, Andreas (4 December 2003). "Stochastic resonance". Reports on Progress in Physics. 67 (1): 45–105. doi:10.1088/0034-4885/67/1/r02.
- Benzi, R. (10 September 2010). "Stochastic resonance: from climate to biology". Nonlinear Processes in Geophysics. 17 (5): 431–441. Bibcode:2010NPGeo..17..431B. doi:10.5194/npg-17-431-2010.

=== Bibliography for suprathreshold stochastic resonance ===
- N. G. Stocks, "Suprathreshold stochastic resonance in multilevel threshold systems," Physical Review Letters, 84, pp. 2310–2313, 2000.
- M. D. McDonnell, D. Abbott, and C. E. M. Pearce, "An analysis of noise enhanced information transmission in an array of comparators," Microelectronics Journal 33, pp. 1079–1089, 2002.
- M. D. McDonnell and N. G. Stocks, "Suprathreshold stochastic resonance," Scholarpedia 4, Article No. 6508, 2009.
- M. D. McDonnell, N. G. Stocks, C. E. M. Pearce, D. Abbott, Stochastic Resonance: From Suprathreshold Stochastic Resonance to Stochastic Signal Quantization, Cambridge University Press, 2008.
- F. Chapeau-Blondeau; D. Rousseau (2004). "Enhancement by noise in parallel arrays of sensors with power-law characteristics". Physical Review E. 70 (6) 060101. Bibcode:2004PhRvE..70f0101C. doi:10.1103/PhysRevE.70.060101. PMID 15697330. S2CID 30684643.
