= Edward W. Piotrowski =

- Born: 1955 (age 70–71); Rybnik, Poland
- Education: University of Silesia
- Known for: Quantum game theory
- Scientific career
- Fields: Physicist
- Workplaces: University of Białystok
- Doctoral advisor: Andrzej Pawlikowski

Edward W. Piotrowski (born 1955 in Rybnik, Poland) is head of the Applied Mathematics Group at the University of Białystok, Poland. He is notable for the analysis of quantum strategies, showing connections between the Kelly criterion, thermodynamics, and special theory of relativity. In the area of econophysics, he discovered extremal properties of fixed point profits of elementary merchant tactics. He has published in the areas of statistical physics, quantum game theory, and econophysics.

== Education ==
He graduated in theoretical physics from the University of Silesia (Katowice) and earned his PhD and habilitation from the University of Silesia, under Andrzej Pawlikowski.

== See also ==
- Quantum Aspects of Life
