= David Ferry =

David Ferry may refer to:

- David Ferry (actor) (born 1951), Canadian-born actor
- David Ferry (poet) (1924–2023), American poet and translator
- David K. Ferry (born 1940), professor of electrical engineering

== See also ==
- David Ferrie (1918–1967), pilot
