= Laszlo B. Kish =

American physicist (born 1955)

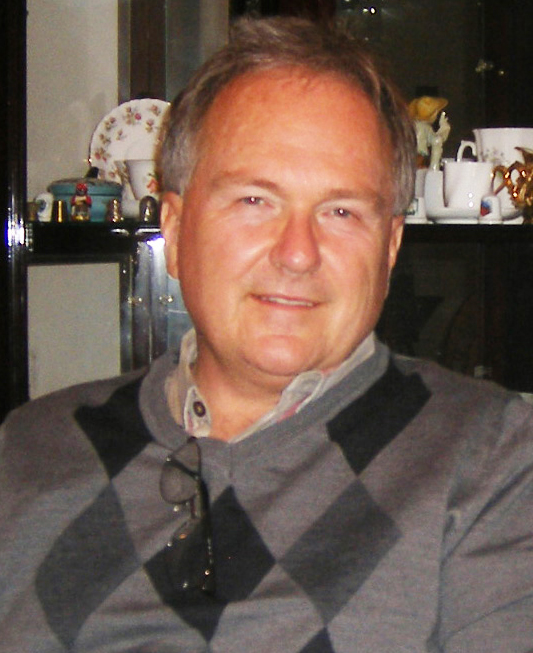
- Laszlo Bela Kish
- Born: 1955 (age 70–71); Hungary
- Education: JATE
- Known for: Kish cypher Noise-based logic Fluctuation-enhanced sensing Sensing of phage-triggered ion cascades (SEPTIC); Johnson noise engines and demons Speed–error–energy limits of computers Zero-power communication Signal-to-noise enhancement in stochastic resonance Percolation noise in high-Tc superconductors 1/f noise measurements, models and critique Founding editor-in-chief of Fluctuation and Noise Letters; Founder of the conference series Unsolved Problems of Noise; Co-founder of SPIE's symposium series Fluctuations and Noise
- Awards: Doctor Honoris Causa from Uppsala University (2011); Benzelius Prize from the Royal Society of Science of Sweden (2001), Doctor Honoris Causa from University of Szeged (2012)
- Scientific career
- Fields: Physicist and Electrical Engineer
- Workplaces: Texas A&M; University of Uppsala
- Academic advisors: Laszlo Vize; Miklos Torok
- Doctoral students: Zoltan Gingl, George Trefan, Jesper Ederth, Anders Hoel, Jong Un Kim, Hung-Chih Chang

Notes
- He changed his name from 'Kiss' to 'Kish' in 1998 while living in Sweden.

Laszlo Bela Kish (born László Béla Kiss) is a physicist and professor of Electrical and Computer Engineering at Texas A&M University. His activities include a wide range of issues surrounding the physics and technical applications of stochastic fluctuations (noises) in physical, biological and technological systems, including nanotechnology. His earlier long-term positions include the Department of Experimental Physics, University of Szeged, Hungary (JATE, 1982–1997), and Angstrom Laboratory, Uppsala University, Sweden (1997–2001). During the same periods he had also conducted scientific research in short-term positions, such as at the Eindhoven University of Technology (Netherlands, 1986, 1997), University of Cologne (Germany, 1989, 1990), National Research Laboratory of Metrology (Japan, 1991), University of Birmingham (United Kingdom, 1993), and others.

== Education ==
He received his MS in physics from Attila József University (JATE), Hungary, 1980; and doctoral degree in solid state physics, at JATE in 1984. He had no official PhD adviser, though his mentors were Laszlo Vize and Miklos Torok. He received a docent in solid state physics (habilitation) from Uppsala University, Sweden, in 1994. He received a Doctor of Science (physics), from the Hungarian Academy of Sciences in 2001.

== Research ==
His main areas of interest have been related to stochastic fluctuations (noise), especially those related to the relevant laws, limits and applications, including the addressing of new or open questions, or exposing fashionable misconceptions. He has/had been working in many related fields, (see his list of publications) such as 1/f noise and its models, stochastic resonance, high-Tc superconductors, noise at percolation and biased percolation, nanoparticles and their lognormal size distribution, self-organized criticality, universal conductance fluctuations, the error–speed–power dissipation issues of physical informatics, noise as information and information carrier, chemical and biological sensing, secure communication, unconventional computation, vibration-induced fluctuation analysis of soils, electronic device noise vs its degradation, weight fluctuations of memory devices during/after writing/deletion of information, etc. He has often played the role of a critic. His inventions and co-inventions include fluctuation-enhanced sensing, SEPTIC method (prompt bacterium detection), secure communication with Johnson-like noise (Kish cypher), speed–error–energy limits of computers, zero-signal-power communication, "information theoretically secure computer hardware", noise-based logic, Electrical noise engines and others.

== Public activity ==
He was the founding editor-in-chief of Fluctuation and Noise Letters (2001–2008), where he is currently Honorary Editor (2009–present). Kish is the founder of the international conference series Unsolved Problems of Noise (held at various locations at every 3rd years since 1996 when he chaired the first meeting). He is co-founder of SPIE's international conference series Fluctuations and Noise (with D. Abbott) and the Hot Topics of Physical Informatics (HotPI) conference series (with David K. Ferry and He Wen). He coauthored the HTML document available for download from the internet, The Dancer and the Piper: Resolving Problems with Government Research Contracting.

== Honors ==
He was the recipient of the year 2001 Benzelius Prize of the Royal Society of Science of Sweden for his activities on fluctuation-enhanced chemical sensing. In 2011, he received the title of Honorary Doctor (Honoris Causa) from Uppsala University, Sweden for his achievement in "research and technical applications of random fluctuations and noise." In 2012, he received the title of Honorary Doctor (Honoris Causa) from the University of Szeged for his "outstanding research work and achievements."

== See also ==
- Noise-based logic
- Fluctuation-enhanced sensing
- Sensing of phage-triggered ion cascades (SEPTIC)
- Fluctuation and Noise Letters
- Quantum Aspects of Life
