= Dragica Vasileska =

Electrical engineer

Dragica Vasileska (also published as Dragica Vasileska-Kafedziska) is an electrical engineer whose research involves what she calls "computational electronics": simulation and modeling of the physics of semiconductor devices, including integrated circuits, solar cells, high-power MOSFETs, and quantum dots. Educated in the former Yugoslavia, in what is now North Macedonia, she works in the US as a professor of electrical, computer and energy engineering at Arizona State University.

== Education and career ==
Vasileska studied electrical engineering at Ss. Cyril and Methodius University of Skopje, in what is now North Macedonia, earning a bachelor's degree in 1985 and a master's degree in 1992. She came to Arizona State University for doctoral study in electrical engineering, and completed her Ph.D. there in 1995. Her dissertation, Green's Functions Formalism for Low-Dimensional Systems, was supervised by David K. Ferry.

After earning her bachelor's degree, she became a lecturer at Ss. Cyril and Methodius University from 1986 to 1990. After her doctorate, she remained at Arizona State University as a postdoctoral researcher and then since 1997 as a faculty member. She was promoted to full professor in 2007.

== Books ==
Vasileska is the coauthor of books including:

- Computational Electronics (with S. M. Goodnick, Morgan & Claypool, 2006)
- Computational Electronics: From Semiclassical to Quantum Transport Modeling (with S. M. Goodnick and Gerhard Klimeck, Taylor & Francis, 2010)
- Modeling Self-Heating Effects in Nanoscale Devices (with K. Raleva, A. Shaik, and S. M. Goodnick, Institute of Physics Publishing, Morgan & Claypool, 2017).

She is also the co-editor of several edited volumes.

== Recognition ==
Vasileska was elected as an IEEE Fellow, in the 2019 class of fellows, "for contributions to computational electronics and simulation of nanoscale devices".
