= Claes-Göran Granqvist =

Swedish materials physicist

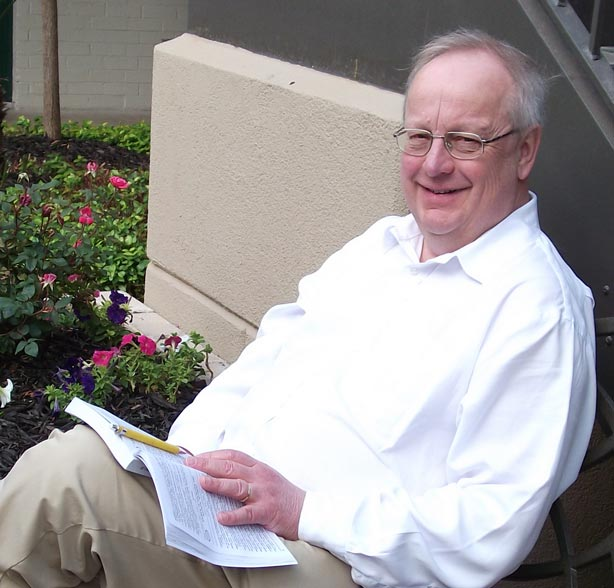
- Granqvist in 2011
- Born: 25 December 1946 (age 79); Helsingborg, Sweden
- Education: Chalmers University of Technology
- Known for: Green nanotechnology, Smart windows, Electrochromism, Nanoparticles, Thermochromism, Fluctuation-Enhanced Sensing, Biomimetics, Radiative cooling, Photocatalitic Materials
- Scientific career
- Fields: Physicist
- Workplaces: Chalmers University of Technology, University of Gothenburg, Uppsala University
- Doctoral advisor: Tord Claeson

Claes-Göran Sture Granqvist (born 25 December 1946, Helsingborg, Sweden) is a materials physicist and Professor of Solid State Physics at Uppsala University in Sweden. Granqvist is considered a pioneer and expert in photochromic materials and energy-efficient building materials such as glass, paint, and wood.

Granqvist is a Fellow of SPIE, the international society for optics and photonics and a Member of the Royal Swedish Academy of Science and the Royal Swedish Academy of Engineering Sciences. He has served as Chairman of the Nobel Committee for Physics of the Royal Swedish Academy of Sciences.

== Education ==
Granqvist received the PhD degree in physics at Chalmers University of Technology, Gothenburg, Sweden, in 1974.

== Career ==
In 1975, Granqvist was a Postdoctoral associate at Cornell University, USA. In the period of 1976–89, he held various research positions at Chalmers University of Technology. From 1989 to 1993 he was a Full Professor of Experimental Physics at University of Gothenburg. Since 1993, he is Full Professor of Solid State Physics and the Head of the Division of Solid State Physics at the Department of Engineering Sciences, The Ångström Laboratory, Uppsala University. In the period 1997–2006 he was the Vice Rector/Senior Advisor for External and International Affairs at Uppsala University.

Granqvist has been involved in the development of several technology companies, including Radicool and Coat AB (formed 1986). In May 2002, he and others at Uppsala University won the Venture Cup competition for best university spin-off business plan. This enabled Granqvist to found ChromoGenics in 2003 with Greger Gregard and other researchers. Granqvist continues to be a member of the board of the company.

== Research ==
Granqvist is a leading figure of Swedish and international science in various fields including nanomaterials; green nanotechnology; materials for solar energy utilization and energy efficiency (solar cells, solar collectors, energy efficient fenestration), electrochromic materials (smart windows); condensed matter physics; biomimetics; photocatalytic materials (air and water cleaning); materials for radiative cooling and superconductivity; fluctuation-enhanced sensing.

Granqvist introduced the term "smart window" in the 1980s, brainstorming ideas with scientists from Lawrence Berkeley National Laboratory in California to make building materials more energy efficient. Granqvist used the term to describe a responsive window capable of dynamically changing its tint. After initially examining thermochromic, photochromic and electrochromic materials, he focused on electrochromic materials. He has developed electrochromic glass for ‘‘intelligent windows’’ by using coatings of tungsten-doped vanadium dioxide to detect and change with environmental conditions.

Granqvist's work as both a researcher and teacher has significantly driven Sweden's development of electrochromic materials. As of 2021, Granqvist has an h-index of 70 and has been cited at least 28,400 times for 600 papers. He had published at research papers in mostly refereed journals and over 30 books, and has given invited conference presentations at about 250 international conferences and chaired about 30 international meetings.

== Honors ==
- 2015, Czochralski Award, European Materials Research Society
- 2011, Mentor Award, Society of Vacuum Coaters, "For his contributions to research and education in coating technologies that help enable displays, solar cells, and electrochromic windows."
- 1998, Award, World Renewable Energy Congress
- 1993, Member of the Royal Swedish Academy of Engineering Sciences (Kungliga Ingenjörsvetenskapsakademien).
- 1989, Arnberg Prize (Arnbergska priset) of The Swedish Royal Academy of Sciences, Prize for best invention of the year (Sweden)
- Member of the Royal Swedish Academy of Sciences (Kungliga Vetenskapsakademien).
- Fellow of SPIE, the international society for optics and photonics.
- Member of the Regia Societas Scientarium Upsaliensis.
- Honorary Membership, Materials Research Society of India.
- Honorary Doctorate, Universidad Nacional Ingenieria, Lima, Peru.

== Selected publications ==
=== Selected papers ===
- Granqvist, C. G.; Buhrman, R. A. (1976). "Ultrafine metal particles". Journal of Applied Physics. 47 (5). AIP Publishing: 2200–2219. doi:10.1063/1.322870. ISSN 0021-8979.
- Hamberg, I.; Granqvist, C. G. (1986). "Evaporated Sn-doped In2O3films: Basic optical properties and applications to energy-efficient windows". Journal of Applied Physics. 60 (11). AIP Publishing: R123–R160. doi:10.1063/1.337534. ISSN 0021-8979.
- Granqvist, C.G (2000). "Electrochromic tungsten oxide films: Review of progress 1993–1998". Solar Energy Materials and Solar Cells. 60 (3). Elsevier BV: 201–262. doi:10.1016/s0927-0248(99)00088-4. ISSN 0927-0248.
- Granqvist, C. G.; Hunderi, O. (15 October 1977). "Optical properties of ultrafine gold particles". Physical Review B. 16 (8). American Physical Society (APS): 3513–3534. doi:10.1103/physrevb.16.3513. ISSN 0556-2805.
- Granqvist, C.G.; Hultåker, A. (2002). "Transparent and conducting ITO films: new developments and applications". Thin Solid Films. 411 (1). Elsevier BV: 1–5. doi:10.1016/s0040-6090(02)00163-3. ISSN 0040-6090.

=== Selected books ===
==== Author ====
- Smith, Geoffrey B.; Granqvist, Claes G. (2011). Green nanotechnology : solutions for sustainability and energy in the built environment. Boca Raton, FL: CRC Press. ISBN 978-1-4200-8532-7.
- Granqvist, Claes G. (1995). Handbook of inorganic electrochromic materials (First ed.). Amsterdam: Elsevier. ISBN 9780080532905., reprinted 2002.
- Granqvist, Claes G. (1989). Spectrally Selective Surfaces for Heating and Cooling Applications. SPIE Press. ISBN 978-0-8194-0228-8.

==== Editor ====
- Torgal, F. Pacheco; Buratti, Cinzia; Kalaiselvam, S.; Granqvist, Claes-Göran; Ivanov, Volodymyr, eds. (4 February 2016). Nano and biotech based materials for energy building efficiency. Switzerland: Springer. ISBN 9783319275055.
- Torgal, Fernando Pacheco; Mistretta, Marina; Kaklauskas, Artūras; Granqvist, Claes G.; Cabeza, Luisa F., eds. (2013). Nearly zero energy building refurbishment : a multidisciplinary approach. London: Springer. doi:10.1007/978-1-4471-5523-2. ISBN 978-1-4471-5522-5.
- Granqvist, Claes; Kish, Laszlo; Marlow, William, eds. (2004). Gas phase nanoparticle synthesis. Dordrecht: Kluwer Academic Publishers. ISBN 978-1402024436.
- Garrett, Martha J.; Granqvist, Claes G., eds. (1998). Basic sciences and development : rethinking donor policy (First ed.). Aldershot, England: Ashgate., reprinted 2018.
- Granqvist, C.G., ed. (1991). Materials science for solar energy conversion systems (First ed.). Oxford [England]: Pergamon Press. ISBN 9781483287577.
- Lampert, C M; Granqvist, C G, eds. (1990). Large-area chromogenics : materials and devices for transmittance control. Volume IS 4. Bellingham, Wash., USA: SPIE Optical Engineering Press. ISBN 0-8194-0069-6.
