= Sensing of phage-triggered ion cascades =

Sensing of phage-triggered ion cascades (SEPTIC) is a prompt bacterium identification method based on fluctuation-enhanced sensing in fluid medium. The advantages of SEPTIC are the specificity and speed (needs only a few minutes) offered by the characteristics of phage infection, the sensitivity due to fluctuation-enhanced sensing, and durability originating from the robustness of phages. An idealistic SEPTIC device may be as small as a pen and maybe able to identify a library of different bacteria within a few minutes measurement window.

== The mechanism ==
SEPTIC utilizes bacteriophages as indicators to trigger an ionic response by the bacteria during phage infection. Microscopic metal electrodes detect the random fluctuations of the electrochemical potential due to the stochastic fluctuations of the ionic concentration gradient caused by the phage infection of bacteria. The electrode pair in the electrolyte with different local ion concentrations at the vicinity of electrodes form an electrochemical cell that produces a voltage depending on the instantaneous ratio of local concentrations. While the concentrations are fluctuating, an alternating random voltage difference will appear between the electrodes. According to the experimental studies, whenever there is an ongoing phage infection, the power density spectrum of the measured electronic noise will have a 1/f ^{2} noise spectrum while, without phage infection, it is a 1/f noise spectrum. In order to have a high sensitivity, a DC electrical field attracts the infected bacteria (which are charged due to ion imbalance) to the electrode with the relevant polarization.

== Advantages ==
The advantages of SEPTIC are the specificity and speed (needs only a few minutes) offered by the characteristics of phage infection, the sensitivity due to fluctuation-enhanced sensing, and durability originating from the robustness of phages. An idealistic SEPTIC device may be as small as a pen and maybe able to identify a library of different bacteria within a few minutes measurement window.

== History ==
The SEPTIC concept was first conceived by Laszlo B. Kish and Maria Dobozi-King in 2004, and developed and demonstrated at the Electrical and Computer Engineering department of Texas A&M University in collaboration with Mosong Cheng, Ry Young, Sergey M. Bezrukov (NIH), and Bob Biard. A new, related scheme, BIPIF, that has recently been conceived and analyzed by Laszlo B. Kish and Gabor Schmera (SPAWAR, United States Navy) utilizes the AC impedance fluctuations at related arrangements, and it promises higher sensitivity and less dependence on the electrodes.
