= Neil F. Johnson =

English physicist (born 1961)

Neil Johnson
- Born: 1961 (age 64–65); Romford, England, United Kingdom
- Citizenship: United Kingdom, United States
- Education: University of Cambridge; Harvard University
- Known for: Complex systems
- Scientific career
- Fields: Physicist
- Workplaces: Harvard University; University of Cambridge; University of Oxford; George Washington University; Universidad de Los Andes; University of Miami
- Doctoral advisor: Henry Ehrenreich
- Doctoral students: Alexandra Olaya-Castro

Neil Fraser Johnson (born 1961) is an English physicist who is notable for his work in complexity theory and complex systems, spanning quantum information, econophysics, and condensed matter physics. He is currently Professor of Physics at George Washington University in Washington, D.C. where he heads up a new initiative in Complexity and Data Science which combines cross-disciplinary fundamental research with data science, with a view to resolving complex real-world problems.

He is a Fellow of the American Physical Society (APS) and is the recipient of the 2018 Burton Award from the APS.

He presented the Royal Institution Christmas Lectures "Arrows of time" on BBC TV in 1999. He has more than 300 published research papers across a wide variety of research topics and has supervised the doctoral theses of more than 25 students. He is also notable for his books Financial Market Complexity published by Oxford University Press and Simply Complexity: A Clear Guide to Complexity Theory published by Oneworld Publications, and for his research on the many-body dynamics of insurgent conflict and online extremism.

== Education and career ==
He attended Southend High School for Boys in Southend-on-Sea, Essex, United Kingdom. He received his BA/MA from St. John's College, Cambridge, University of Cambridge where he was elected as a Scholar throughout his undergraduate career. He obtained a First each year, and obtained top First in the final examinations. He was awarded the Hartree and Maxwell prizes. He was awarded a scholarship to attend Harvard University as a Kennedy Scholar where he received his PhD in 1989.

Following his PhD, he was first appointed as a Research Fellow at the University of Cambridge, then as a Professor at the Universidad de Los Andes, Bogotá. He was then Professor of Physics at the University of Oxford until 2007, having joined the faculty in 1992. After a period as Professor of Physics at the University of Miami in Florida, he was appointed Professor of Physics at George Washington University in 2018.

While a student at school and university, Johnson was a sax player with the National Youth Jazz Orchestra (NYJO) in the United Kingdom and toured extensively with them. He appears on a number of commercial recordings with NYJO and with other artists as a session musician.

== Selected publications ==
- Johnson, Neil F.; Jefferies, Paul; Hui, Pak Ming (2003). Financial Market Complexity. Oxford University Press. ISBN 0-19-852665-2.
- Olaya-Castro, Alexandra; Fassioli Olsen, Francesca; Lee, Chiu Fan; Johnson, Neil F. (2008). "Ultrafast Quantum Dynamics in Photosynthesis". In Derek Abbott; Paul C W Davies; Arun K Pati (eds.). Quantum Aspects of Life. Imperial College Press. ISBN 978-1-84816-253-2.
- Johnson, Neil F. (2009). Simply Complexity, A Clear Guide to Complexity Theory. Oxford: Oneworld. ISBN 978-1-85168-630-8.
