= Luca Gammaitoni =

Italian physicist

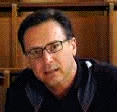
- Born: 16 June 1961 (age 65); Perugia, Italy
- Citizenship: Italian
- Education: University of Pisa
- Known for: Studies of noise in physical systems
- Scientific career
- Fields: Physicist
- Workplaces: University of Perugia
- Doctoral advisor: Sergio Santucci

Luca Gammaitoni (born 16 June 1961 in Perugia) is a scientist in the area of noise and nonlinear dynamics. He is currently the Director of the Noise in Physical System Laboratory (NiPS Lab) at the Physics Department of the Università di Perugia, in Italy.

== Education and career ==
He graduated in physics at the University of Perugia and obtained his Ph.D. in physics from the University of Pisa in 1991 (S. Santucci advisor) with a thesis entitled "Stochastic Resonance". He is currently Professor of Physics at the Faculty of Science of the University of Perugia in Italy and the Director of The Noise in Physical Systems (NiPS) Laboratory. NiPS, a research facility within the Physics Department of the University of Perugia, has a long-standing tradition in studying physical systems in the presence of noise.

In 2004 he was awarded the First prize for innovation ideas, a Spin-off competition, of the University of Perugia. Eventually, this led to the establishment of Wisepower srl. An innovative company devoted to the development of advanced technology in the field of self-powered wireless devices.

In 2016 he received the Special Breakthrough Prize in Fundamental Physics for the observation of gravitational waves, opening new horizons in astronomy and physics, as a member of the LIGO-Virgo collaboration.

In 2016-2019 he served as President of the Fondazione POST (Museo della Scienza di Perugia).

During the Covid-19 pandemic, together with Igor Neri, proposed a stochastic model for dealing with fluctuations in epidemic diffusion.

His scientific papers received more than 100.000 citations.

== Scientific Interests ==
- Stochastic nonlinear dynamics with specific reference to Stochastic Resonance, dithering, resonant trapping, resonant crossing phenomena.
- Noise limits in the operation of Gravitational Waves detectors
- Energy Harvesting, with specific reference to nonlinear vibration harvesting, micro and nanoscale energy management
- Energy efficiency in computing devices, with specific reference to micro and nanoscale logic gate devices ISBN 978-9535130116
- Thermal noise and non-equilibrium relaxation processes in solid state systems ISBN 978-1-4799-2069-3
- Thermodynamics of computing and fundamental limits in the physics of computation
- Epidemics spreading and the role of fluctuations
- Artificial Intelligence fundamental limits in Big Data and Machine Learning applications

== Books ==
- On the concept of time and other accidents: simple scientific digressions for curious people, L. Gammaitoni, 2022, ISBN 979-8825591902
- The Physics of Computing, Springer, 2021, doi:10.1007/978-3-030-87108-6
- Perché è difficile prevedere il futuro. Il sogno più sfuggente dell'uomo sotto la lente della fisica L. Gammaitoni and A. Vulpiani, Dedalo ed. 2019 (in Italian), ISBN 978-8822068828
- Introduzione alla scienza dei computer, L. Gammaitoni, McGraw-Hill, (in Italian), 2004, ISBN 978-8838662218
