= Fluctuation-enhanced sensing =

Type of chemical or biological sensing

Fluctuation-enhanced sensing (FES) is a specific type of chemical or biological sensing where the stochastic component, noise, of the sensor signal is analyzed. The stages following the sensor in a FES system typically contain filters and preamplifier(s) to extract and amplify the stochastic signal components, which are usually microscopic temporal fluctuations that are orders of magnitude weaker than the sensor signal. Then selected statistical properties of the amplified noise are analyzed, and a corresponding pattern is generated as the stochastic fingerprint of the sensed agent. Often the power density spectrum of the stochastic signal is used as output pattern however FES has been proven effective with more advanced methods, too, such as higher-order statistics.

== History ==
During the 1990s, several authors (for example, Bruno Neri and coworkers, Peter Gottwald and Bela Szentpali) had proposed using the spectrum of measured noise to obtain information about ambient chemical conditions. However, the first systematic proposal for a generic electronic nose utilizing chemical sensors in FES mode, and the related mathematical analysis with experimental demonstration, were carried out only in 1999 by Laszlo B. Kish, Robert Vajtai and C.G. Granqvist at Uppsala University. The name "fluctuation-enhanced sensing" was created by John Audia (United States Navy), in 2001, after learning about the published scheme. In 2003, Alexander Vidybida from Bogolyubov Institute for Theoretical Physics of the National Academy of Sciences of Ukraine has proven mathematically that adsorption–desorption fluctuations during odor primary reception can be used for improving selectivity.

During the years, FES has been developed and demonstrated in many studies with various types of sensors and agents in chemical and biological systems. Bacteria have also been detected and identified by FES, either by their odor in air, or by the "SEPTIC" method in liquid phase.

In the period of 2006–2009 Signal Processing Inc (Chiman Kwan) developed a portable FES device in collaboration with Texas A&M University (Laszlo B. Kish) and University of Szeged (Zoltan Gingl and Peter Heszler). Efforts to explore higher-order statistics for FES purposes were led by Janusz Smulko. SPAWAR (United States Navy) related FES projects were led by Gabor Schmera (see the US Navy patent site below).
