= Fluctuation and Noise Letters =

Fluctuation Noise Letters
- Discipline: Multi-disciplinary
- Language: English
- Edited by: P V E McClintock

Publication details
- History: 2001-present
- Publisher: World Scientific (Singapore)
- Impact factor: 1.310 (2020)

Standard abbreviations
- ISO 4: Fluct. Noise Lett.

Indexing
- ISSN: 0219-4775 (print); 1793-6780 (web)

Links
- Journal homepage

Fluctuation and Noise Letters (FNL) is a journal published by World Scientific since 2001. It is at present the only journal solely dedicated to interdisciplinary articles on fluctuations and noise in physical, biological, and technological systems, and encourages open public debate.

Some topics covered to date include: noise-enhanced phenomena including stochastic resonance; cardiovascular dynamics; quantum fluctuations; statistical physics; degradation and aging phenomena; traffic; the stock market; and climate.

The founder and first Editor-in-Chief of FNL was Laszlo B. Kish (Texas A&M University, USA) who was in charge in the period of 2001–2008. Since 2009, the Editor-in-Chief is Peter V. E. McClintock (Lancaster University, UK).

== Abstracting and indexing ==
The journal is indexed in:

- Mathematical Reviews
- INSPEC
- Science Citation Index Expanded
- Current Contents/Physical, Chemical & Earth Sciences
- CompuMath Citation Index
- ISI Alerting Services
