= Jan Sładkowski =

Polish physicist (born 1958)

- Born: 1958 (age 67–68); Świętochłowice, Poland
- Education: University of Silesia
- Known for: Quantum game theory
- Scientific career
- Fields: Physicist
- Workplaces: University of Silesia
- Doctoral advisor: Marek Zrałek

Jan Sładkowski (born 1958 in Świętochłowice) is a Polish physicist. He is notable for his work on the role of exotic smoothness in cosmology, quantum game theory, and applications of thermodynamics in the theory of finance.

== Education ==
He earned his PhD, under Marek Zrałek, and habilitation in theoretical physics from the University of Silesia, Katowice, Poland. He has published a number of papers on quantum field theory, mathematical physics, quantum information processing, and econophysics.

== Career ==
He has held visiting posts at the Bielefeld University and at the University of Wisconsin–Madison. He presently holds the Chair of Astrophysics and Cosmology at the University of Silesia.

== Honors ==
In 1999, he was a Humboldt fellow.

== See also ==
- Quantum Aspects of Life
