= Charles E. M. Pearce =

New Zealand/Australian mathematician

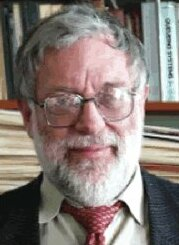
- Charles Pearce in 2001. (Photo: Andrew G. Allison)
- Born: 29 March 1940; Wellington, New Zealand
- Died: 8 June 2012 (aged 72); Manakaiua River, West Coast, New Zealand
- Education: Victoria University of Wellington; University of New Zealand; Australian National University
- Known for: Probabilistic modelling
- Awards: ANZIAM Medal (2001); ASOR Ren Potts Award (2007)
- Scientific career
- Fields: Mathematician
- Workplaces: The University of Adelaide
- Doctoral advisor: Pat Moran

Charles Edward Miller Pearce (29 March 1940 – 8 June 2012) was a New Zealand/Australian mathematician. At the time of his death on 8 June 2012 he was the (Sir Thomas) Elder Professor of Mathematics at the University of Adelaide.

== Early life ==
Pearce was born in Wellington. His early schooling was in Wellington and he was dux of Hutt Valley High School in 1957. He earned his Bachelor of Science (a double major in Applied and Pure Mathematics and a further double major in Physics and Mathematical Physics) and in 1962 he earned a Masters of Science with first class honours in Mathematics, all from Victoria University of Wellington. The bachelor's degree was from the University of New Zealand, as the constituent colleges of UNZ, of which Victoria University College was one of four, had proliferated into four autonomous Universities by the time Pearce completed his master's degree.

== New Zealand origins ==
Pearce always remained proud of his New Zealand origins. Being descended from Maori people, he claimed his New Zealand ancestry was longer than almost all his peers from New Zealand.

Pearce is descended from Alexander Gray, one of just five Scots who settled in New Zealand as part of the original and largely strong interest in Maoritanga and claimed ancestral connection to three waka (canoes) in the heke (migration): Aotea, Kurahaupo and Takatimu. His principal tribal connection was with the Ngati Ruanui, based in the southern Taranaki.

== Life and career ==
In 1963 Pearce left New Zealand for doctoral study at the Australian National University (ANU) in Canberra, under the supervision of Pat Moran. Thereafter followed short stints (1 to 3 years) as lecturer at: ANU; University of Queensland (visiting Professor); Université de Rennes 1, France; and University of Sheffield (1966–68). He was appointed to the University of Adelaide in 1968 and remained there for the ensuing years, having been promoted to senior lecturer in 1971, Reader in 1982 and professor in 2003. He was a leading figure in the Department of Applied Mathematics there, being appointed in 2005 to the Elder Chair of Mathematics.

While at ANU, he met and married Frances (née O'Connor), and they brought up their two daughters, Emma and Ann, in Adelaide. Charles died in a motor vehicle accident near Fox Glacier on the NZ South Island on 8 June 2012.

== Mathematical work ==
He is known for probabilistic and statistical modelling. Pearce published prolifically in the area of probabilistic and statistical modelling and analysis, with strong contributions being made in both theory and practice. His book with Dragomir addresses the fine points of the Hermite–Hadamard inequality and is published by Kluwer Academic Press. His applied interests included queuing theory, road traffic, telecommunications, and urban planning. With former student Bill Henderson, who followed him from Sheffield to Adelaide, he helped establish the successful Teletraffic Centre in the University of Adelaide. Publications are numerous and include three books, 23 book chapters, and over 300 research articles.

With the formation of the Division of Applied Mathematics of the Australian Mathematical society, Pearce soon emerged as a key figure. The most enduring significant role was as Chief Editor of their Applied Mathematics Journal, now called The ANZIAM Journal of Applied Mathematics. The formation of ANZIAM in 1993 was close to Pearce's heart, as it encapsulated the union he espoused of joint activity in Applied Mathematics involving both Australia and New Zealand. He was a strong worker for ANZIAM and it was fitting that this, along with his outstanding research work, was recognised by the award of the ANZIAM Medal in 2001.

Pearce was elected as a Fellow of the New Zealand Mathematical Society in 2003 and was awarded the ASOR Ren Potts Award in 2007.

== Books by Pearce ==
- Charles E. M. Pearce and F. M. Pearce, Oceanic Migration: Paths, Sequence, Timing and Range of Prehistoric Migration in the Pacific and Indian Oceans, Springer, 2010, ISBN 978-90-481-3825-8.
- Charles E. M. Pearce and Emma Hunt (Eds), Optimization: Structure and Applications, Springer, 2009.
- Mark D. McDonnell, Nigel G. Stocks, Charles E. M. Pearce, and Derek Abbott, Stochastic Resonance, Cambridge University Press, 2008, ISBN 978-0-521-88262-0.
- Sever S. Dragomir and Charles E. M. Pearce, Selected Topics on Hermite-Hadamard Inequalities and Applications, RGMIA Monographs, Victoria University, 2000.
