= Apoorva D. Patel =

Indian physicist

Apoorva Dayaram Patel
- Apoorva Dayaram Patel with R. Feynman in 1984, at California Institute of Technology.
- Education: Indian Institute of Technology, Bombay; California Institute of Technology
- Known for: Quantum Chromodynamics
- Awards: President of India Gold Medal (1980, IIT Bombay)
- Scientific career
- Fields: Physicist
- Workplaces: Indian Institute of Science, European Organization for Nuclear Research
- Doctoral advisor: Geoffrey Charles Fox

Apoorva Dayaram Patel (Apoorva D. Patel) is a professor at the Centre for High Energy Physics, Indian Institute of Science, Bangalore. He is notable for his work on quantum algorithms, and the application of information theory concepts to understand the structure of genetic languages. His major field of work has been the theory of quantum chromodynamics, where he has used lattice gauge theory techniques to investigate spectral properties, phase transitions, and matrix elements.

== Education ==
He obtained his MSc in physics (1980) from the Indian Institute of Technology Bombay, and PhD in physics from the California Institute of Technology under Geoffrey C. Fox (1984), with a thesis entitled: Monte Carlo Renormalisation Group for Lattice QCD.

== Career ==
He was a Scientific Associate, Theory Division, CERN in Geneva, Switzerland, 1987–1989, and then in 1989 he joined the Indian Institute of Science, Bangalore, as a faculty member.

== Personal life ==
In 1989, he married Rashmi, a surgeon specializing in laparoscopy and endosurgery. His son, Aavishkar, was born in 1990.

== See also ==
- Quantum Aspects of Life
