= Mark D. McDonnell =

- Born: 28 February 1975 (age 51); Adelaide, Australia
- Education: University of Adelaide
- Known for: SSR
- Scientific career
- Fields: Electronic Engineer and mathematician
- Workplaces: University of Adelaide; University of South Australia
- Doctoral advisor: Derek Abbott; Charles E. M. Pearce
- Other academic advisors: Nigel G. Stocks

Mark Damian McDonnell (born 28 February 1975) is an Australian electronic engineer and mathematician, notable for his work on stochastic resonance and more specifically suprathreshold stochastic resonance.

== Education ==
McDonnell graduated from the Salesian College, Adelaide. He received a BSc in Mathematical & Computer Sciences (1997), a BE (Hons) in Electrical & Electronic Engineering (1998), and a BSc (Hons) in Applied Mathematics (2001) all from The University of Adelaide, Australia. He received his PhD in Electrical & Electronic Engineering (2006), under Derek Abbott and Charles E. M. Pearce, also from the University of Adelaide, for a thesis entitled Theoretical Aspects of Stochastic Signal Quantisation and Suprathreshold Stochastic Resonance. During the course of his PhD, he was also a visiting scholar at the University of Warwick, UK, under Nigel G. Stocks.

== Career ==
McDonnell worked as a research assistant in electromagnetic propagation, ice-penetrating radar, and as a computer systems engineer, at the University of Adelaide. His main research interests are in the field of nonlinear signal processing, with applications in computational neuroscience, complex systems, and lossy compression, reliable communication, and coding of noisy signals.

== Honors ==
In 2002, McDonnell was awarded a D. R. Stranks Fellowship, and in 2003, he was awarded a Santa Fe Institute Complex Systems Fellowship, as well as the AFUW Doreen MacCarthy Bursary. In 2004 he was the recipient of an Australian Academy of Science Young Researcher's Award. He was awarded the Postgraduate Alumni University Medal for his PhD thesis. In 2007, he won a Fresh Science award, the Gertrude Rohan Prize, and an Australian Postdoctoral Fellowship that he took up at the University of South Australia.

== Books by McDonnell ==
- Mark D. McDonnell, Nigel G. Stocks, Charles E. M. Pearce, and Derek Abbott, Stochastic Resonance, Cambridge University Press, 2008, ISBN 978-0-521-88262-0.

== See also ==
- Stochastic resonance
- Suprathreshold stochastic resonance
- Stochastic Resonance (book)
