= Julio Gea-Banacloche =

American physicist

- Born: 1957 (age 68–69); Seville, Spain
- Citizenship: American
- Education: University of New Mexico; Universidad Autonoma de Madrid
- Known for: Energy bound on quantum computation
- Scientific career
- Fields: Physicist
- Workplaces: University of Arkansas
- Doctoral advisor: Marlan O. Scully

Julio Gea-Banacloche (born 1957) is professor of physics and currently the head of the department of physics at the University of Arkansas. He is notable for his contribution to the field of quantum information, where he has shown that the quantum mechanical nature of the fields used to manipulate the quantum information carriers (qubits) themselves might lead to unpredictable errors in the performance of the quantum logical operations. The lower bound on the size of these errors can be made smaller by increasing the energy of the control system. This has led Gea-Banacloche to predict a minimum energy requirement for quantum computation, which has given rise to some controversy.

== Education ==
He received his BS from Universidad Autonoma de Madrid, 1979; and obtained his PhD under Marlan O. Scully, 1985, on free-electron lasers, from the University of New Mexico with a thesis entitled: Quantum Theory of the Free-Electron Laser.

== Career ==
In 1985–1987, he served as a research associate, Max Planck Institute for Quantum Optics. In 1988-1990 he was a staff scientist, Instituto de Optica, Madrid, Spain. In 1990, he joined the University of Arkansas. He is an associate editor of Physical Review A and Fellow of the American Physical Society. He has carried out theoretical work in laser physics, quantum optics, and quantum information.

== See also ==
- Quantum Aspects of Life
