= Janusz Smulko =

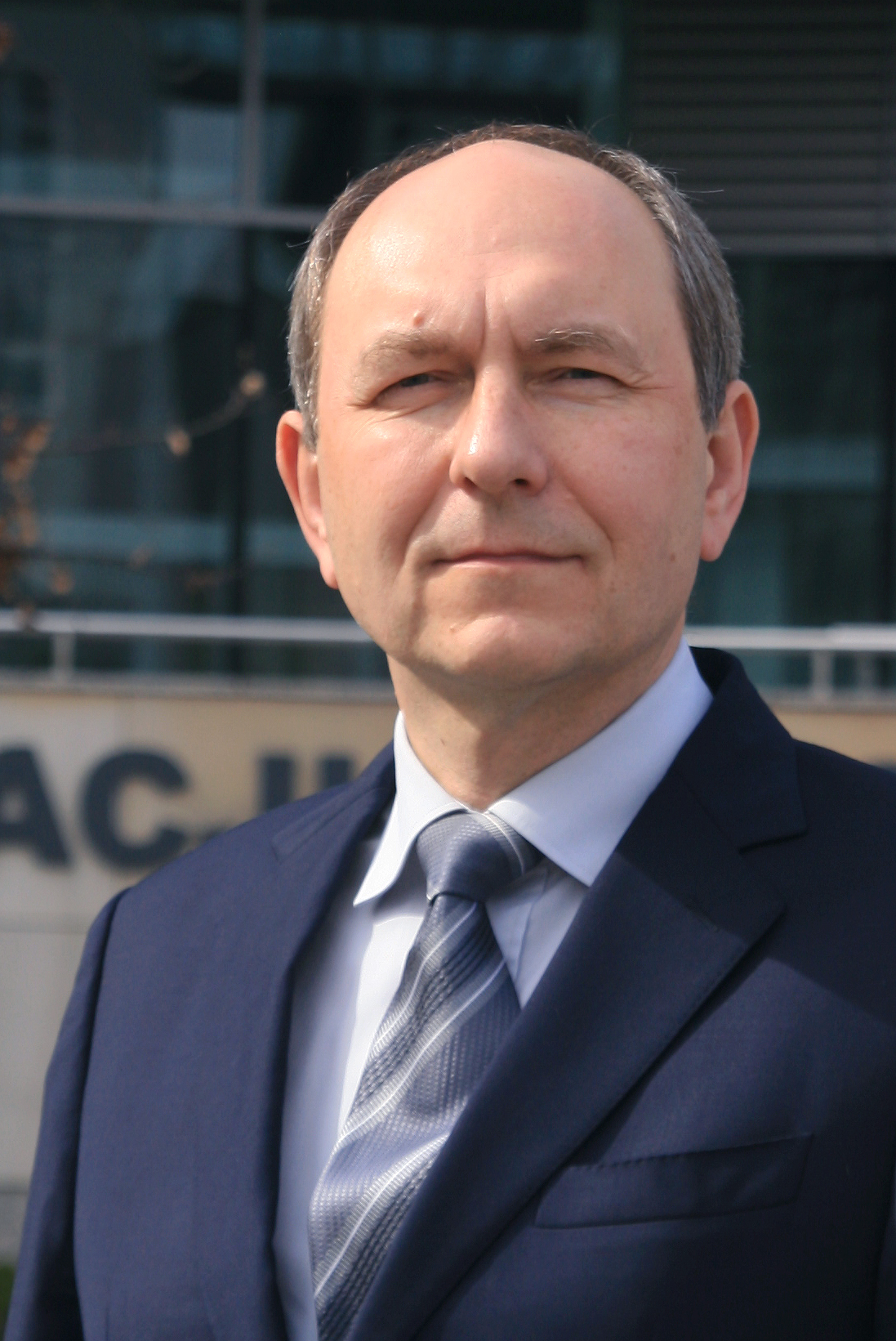
- Janusz Smulko
- Born: 25 April 1964 (age 62); Kolno, Poland
- Citizenship: Polish
- Education: Gdańsk University of Technology
- Awards: Ribbon
- Scientific career
- Fields: Reliability assessment of electronic devices (electrochromic materials, supercapacitors, varistors, thin metal foil capacitors), Fluctuation Enhanced Sensing (various systems and sensors), Gas sensing, Raman spectroscopy, Noise in biological systems, Signal processing.

Janusz Smulko (born April 25, 1964 in Kolno, Poland) is a Polish electronics engineer, full professor of Gdańsk University of Technology. Research Interests: reliability assessment of electronic devices (electrochromic materials, supercapacitors, varistors, thin metal foil capacitors), fluctuation-enhanced sensing (various systems and sensors), gas sensing, Raman spectroscopy, noise in biological systems, signal processing. Since September 2016 – Vice-Rector for Scientific Research, Gdańsk University of Technology, Poland.

== Education ==
Janusz Smulko graduated in 1989 with honors from the Faculty of Electronics at Gdańsk University of Technology, specialising in measuring instruments. In 1989 he took second place in the Red Rose competition for the best student in the Pomerania Region, Poland.

== Career ==
Since the beginning of his career he has been associated with Gdańsk University of Technology: research assistant (1989-1996), Assistant Professor (1996-2012), Associate Professor (2012-2014), Full Professor (since 2014), Head of Department of Metrology and Electronics (since 2015), Vice-Rector for Scientific Research (since 2016) at GUT. He did scientific internships in Texas A&M University (2003, NATO Advanced Fellowship), Uppsala University (2006, 2008, STINT Foundation Fellowship), Massachusetts Institute of Technology (2011, 2013 Inter Ph.D. scholarships).

== Research interests ==
His research concerns random signals used as a source of information for the detection of gases, types of corrosion and to assess the quality of materials and electronic components. He has published over 150 scientific papers, including 85 in the journals from the JCR database (2 as a review paper). The author of 2 monographs, and co-author of two academic textbooks. He has delivered 12 invited lectures at conferences. His work has been cited more than 500 times (without self citations), and the Hirsch index is 18.

== Positions ==
Since September 2016 – Vice-Rector for Scientific Research, Gdańsk University of Technology (GUT), Poland. Since 2013 he has been the head of the Department of Metrology and Optoelectronics. Promoter of 4 completed doctorates (all with honors) and tutor of 4 doctoral students. Editor-in-chief of the ‘Science Bulletin’ of the Faculty of Electronics, Telecommunications and Informatics at GUT (2012-2013). Editor-in-chief of "Metrology and Measurement Systems" (since 2016, the IF for 2015 is 1,140). Member of the Committee of Metrology and Scientific Instrumentation of the Polish Academy of Sciences (since 2011). Chairman of the IEEE Computer Society Chapter Gdańsk. He reviewed 7 doctoral theses and 3 habilitation procedures.

Janusz Smulko managed 6 research projects with a total amount of financing of over 3 million PLN. Awarded with 16 GUT Rector prizes. He was awarded the Silver Cross of Merit (2003) and the Medal of the National Education Commission (2009).

Actively cooperates with all the universities where he held his research internships and with Brno University of Technology, Universitat Rovira i Virgili University of Pamplona.

His most important non-scientific interest is history. He spends his free time mountain trekking, cycling and playing floorball.
