= Henry Ehrenreich =

American material scientist

- Born: May 11, 1928; Frankfurt, Germany
- Died: January 20, 2008 (aged 79); Belmont, Massachusetts, U.S.
- Education: Cornell University; Columbia University
- Scientific career
- Fields: Physics
- Workplaces: Harvard University; General Electric Research Laboratory
- Thesis: Scattering of Holes by Phonons in Germanium (1955)
- Doctoral advisor: Albert Overhauser
- Doctoral students: Neil F. Johnson

Henry Ehrenreich (May 11, 1928 – January 20, 2008) was an American physicist and Harvard professor who did research on semiconductors and solid-state physics.

After fleeing Germany as a child, his family settled in New York where he attended university. He conducted research in a laboratory for General Electric, and his expertise in semiconductors and the physics of materials allowed him to advise two US departments. As a professor, he devoted much effort to improve the quality of education, eventually becoming the first ombudsman for Harvard.

== Personal life ==
Henry Ehrenreich was born on May 11, 1928, in Frankfurt to German Jews Frieda and Nathan Ehrenreich. His father was a prominent pianist and choral conductor, but in 1934 lost his position under the Nazi regime and was deported to Dachau in the wake of the Kristallnacht. He was released on December 7, 1938, and was able to flee Germany ten days later.

Henry was able to flee Germany via the Kindertransport, and was first taken to a foster home in England, but was soon sent to another foster home in Letchworth due to the evacuation of children from London. His German-speaking foster family there held Nazi sympathies and mistreated him. After his mother fled Germany on August 24, 1939, shortly before war broke out, he was placed with another family in Ditchling, where they could visit.

The family finally obtained US visas in the fall of 1939, and was finally reunited in March 1940 in New York. His father found work two years later as a choral conductor in Buffalo and Henry enrolled in high school there. A New York State scholarship allowed him to study at Cornell where he graduated in 1950. A year earlier, he met Tema Hasnas, and they married in 1953.

Notwithstanding his decision to become a theoretical physicist, Ehrenreich shared a love for music with his father and was a skilled pianist. He was also an early adopter of e-mail and the World Wide Web, despite already being considered an "elder of the faculty" in 1996. He stated that he got a PowerBook because Macs were "for idiots" and "kind of lick your hands and are friendly", but was still asking people in the hall for technical help.

He died on January 20, 2008, in Belmont, leaving behind his wife Tema, his daughter, his two sons and 10 grandchildren.

== Career ==
After graduating, Ehrenreich studied at Columbia University for an academic year, returning to Cornell in 1951 where he began work as an assistant teacher. He took an interest in semiconductors and related problems, and started writing his doctoral thesis under Albert Overhauser on the "Scattering of Holes by Phonons in Germanium", finishing it in 1955.

To continue his research into surface and solid state science, he went to the General Electric Research Laboratory. During his time there, three children were born to the couple.

He moved to Harvard University in 1960 and was appointed professor in 1963 at the Harvard Division of Engineering and Applied Sciences. His research coincided with the boom in semiconductor applications, and Ehrenreich authored over 200 papers over the course of his career. He also co-authored the annual review Solid State Physics together with Frederick Seitz and David Turnbull.

During the 1973 oil crisis, he was asked to assess solar photovoltaic cells, served as an advisor to the Department of Energy, and headed a study group on the matter from 1977 to 1981 before testifying to Congress in 1985. He also served on the DARPA Materials Council of the Department of Defense for 20 years, and participated in numerous national and international committees.

Apart from his scientific contributions, Ehrenreich actively tried to improve Harvard undergraduate education in science and engineering and chaired the Core Committee on Science between 1987 and 1999. When the Core Curriculum at Harvard came under scrutiny in 1989, he remarked: "The present system we have is working pretty well. But you can always ask if we can do better."

Ehrenreich was also part of a committee that decided on Free Speech Guidelines at Harvard in the wake of an intense debate about a Confederate Flag hung from a dorm room window in 1990. In February 2003, Ehrenreich and Lydia Cummings were appointed ombudsmen for Harvard university, promising a "safe haven" for people affected by problems stemming from the university, with the office remaining independent of Harvard's administrative structure. They handled around 150 cases during the first year.

Ehrenreich was critical of a distinction between "strategic" applied research and "curiosity-driven" basic research, recounting the freedom to choose his own projects at the General Electric lab, and pointing to advances in semiconductor science that he saw as the result of an open stance towards basic research during the 50s.
