= Stochastic resonance (sensory neurobiology) =

Stochastic resonance is a phenomenon that occurs in a threshold measurement system (e.g. a man-made instrument or device; a natural cell, organ or organism) when an appropriate measure of information transfer (signal-to-noise ratio, mutual information, coherence, d', etc.) is maximized in the presence of a non-zero level of stochastic input noise thereby lowering the response threshold; the system resonates at a particular noise level.

The three criteria that must be met for stochastic resonance to occur are:

1. Nonlinear device or system: the input-output relationship must be nonlinear
2. Weak, periodic signal of interest: the input signal must be below threshold of measurement device and recur periodically
3. Added input noise: there must be random, uncorrelated variation added to signal of interest

Stochastic resonance occurs when these conditions combine in such a way that a certain average noise intensity results in maximized information transfer. A time-averaged (or, equivalently, low-pass filtered) output due to signal of interest plus noise will yield an even better measurement of the signal compared to the system's response without noise in terms of signal-to-noise ratio (SNR).

The idea of adding noise to a system in order to improve the quality of measurements is counter-intuitive. Measurement systems are usually constructed or evolved to reduce noise as much as possible and thereby provide the most precise measurement of the signal of interest. Numerous experiments have demonstrated that, in both biological and non-biological systems, the addition of noise can actually improve the probability of detecting the signal; this is stochastic resonance. The systems in which stochastic resonance occur are always nonlinear systems. The addition of noise to a linear system will always decrease the information transfer rate.

== History ==
Stochastic resonance was first discovered in a study of the periodic recurrence of Earth's ice ages. The theory developed out of an effort to understand how the Earth's climate oscillates periodically between two relatively stable global temperature states, one "normal" and the other an "ice age" state. The conventional explanation was that variations in the eccentricity of Earth's orbital path occurred with a period of about 100,000 years and caused the average temperature to shift dramatically. The measured variation in the eccentricity had a relatively small amplitude compared to the dramatic temperature change, however, and stochastic resonance was developed to show that the temperature change due to the weak eccentricity oscillation and added stochastic variation due to the unpredictable energy output of the Sun (known as the solar constant) could cause the temperature to move in a nonlinear fashion between two stable dynamic states.

== Images ==
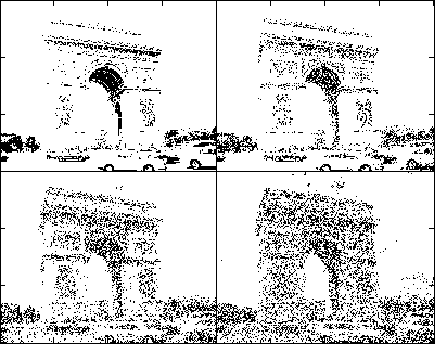
The above 256-grayscale-level images of the Arc result when the original is modified by the addition of noise and carrying out a nonlinear threshold operation; each panel shows a different level of noise variance, with a standard deviation of 10 grayscale levels in the top left, 50 levels in the top right, 100 in the bottom left and 150 in the bottom right. Different panels allow the best detection of different features; for example, the designs on the pillars are best seen in the top right, while the full outline of the arc is best seen in the bottom left. The appearance of features also changes with the size of the image as a result of averaging of the image; this can be observed by viewing the image at different distances.

As an example of stochastic resonance, consider the following demonstration after Simonotto et al.

The Arc de Triomphe

The image to the left shows an original picture of the Arc de Triomphe in Paris. If this image is passed through a nonlinear threshold filter in which each pixel detects light intensity as above or below a given threshold, a representation of the image is obtained as in the images to the right. It can be hard to discern the objects in the filtered image in the top left because of the reduced amount of information present. The addition of noise before the threshold operation can result in a more recognizable output. The image below shows four versions of the image after the threshold operation with different levels of noise variance; the image in the top right hand corner appears to have the optimal level of noise allowing the Arc to be recognized, but other noise variances reveal different features.

The quality of the image resulting from stochastic resonance can be improved further by blurring, or subjecting the image to low-pass spatial filtering. This can be approximated in the visual system by squinting one's eyes or moving away from the image. This allows the observer's visual system to average the pixel intensities over areas, which is in effect a low-pass filter. The resonance breaks up the harmonic distortion due to the threshold operation by spreading the distortion across the spectrum, and the low-pass filter eliminates much of the noise that has been pushed into higher spatial frequencies.

A similar output could be achieved by examining multiple threshold levels, so in a sense the addition of noise creates a new effective threshold for the measurement device.

== Animal physiology ==
=== Cuticular mechanoreceptors in crayfish ===
Evidence for stochastic resonance in a sensory system was first found in nerve signals from the mechanoreceptors located on the tail fan of the crayfish (Procambarus clarkii). An appendage from the tail fan was mechanically stimulated to trigger the cuticular hairs that the crayfish uses to detect pressure waves in water. The stimulus consisted of sinusoidal motion at 55.2 Hz with random Gaussian noise at varying levels of average intensity. Spikes along the nerve root of the terminal abdominal ganglion were recorded extracellularly for 11 cells and analyzed to determine the SNR.

Two separate measurements were used to estimate the signal-to-noise ratio of the neural response. The first was based on the Fourier power spectrum of the spike time series response. The power spectra from the averaged spike data for three different noise intensities all showed a clear peak at the 55.2 Hz component with different average levels of broadband noise. The relatively low- and mid-level added noise conditions also show a second harmonic component at about 110 Hz. The mid-level noise condition clearly shows a stronger component at the signal of interest than either low- or high-level noise, and the harmonic component is greatly reduced at mid-level noise and not present in the high-level noise. A standard measure of the SNR as a function of noise variance shows a clear peak at the mid-level noise condition. The other measure used for SNR was based on the inter-spike interval histogram instead of the power spectrum. A similar peak was found on a plot of SNR as a function of noise variance for mid-level noise, although it was slightly different from that found using the power spectrum measurement.

These data support the claim that noise can enhance detection at the single neuron level but are not enough to establish that noise helps the crayfish detect weak signals in a natural setting. Experiments performed after this at a slightly higher level of analysis establish behavioral effects of stochastic resonance in other organisms; these are described below.

=== Cercal mechanoreceptors in crickets ===
A similar experiment was performed on the cricket (Acheta domestica), an arthropod like the crayfish. The cercal system in the cricket senses the displacement of particles due to air currents utilizing filiform hairs covering the cerci, the two antenna-like appendages extending from the posterior section of the abdomen. Sensory interneurons in terminal abdominal ganglion carry information about intensity and direction of pressure perturbations. Crickets were presented with signal plus noise stimuli and the spikes from cercal interneurons due to this input were recorded.

Two types of measurements of stochastic resonance were conducted. The first, like the crayfish experiment, consisted of a pure tone pressure signal at 23 Hz in a broadband noise background of varying intensities. A power spectrum analysis of the signals yielded maximum SNR for a noise intensity equal to 25 times the signal stimulus resulting in a maximum increase of 600% in SNR. A total of 14 cells in 12 animals were tested, and all showed an increased SNR at a particular level of noise, meeting the requirements for the occurrence of stochastic resonance.

The other measurement consisted of the rate of mutual information transfer between the nerve signal and a broadband stimulus combined with varying levels of broadband noise uncorrelated with the signal. The power spectrum SNR could not be calculated in the same manner as before because there were signal and noise components present at the same frequencies. Mutual information measures the degree to which one signal predicts another; independent signals carry no mutual information, while perfectly identical signals carry maximal mutual information. For varying low amplitudes of signal, stochastic resonance peaks were found in plots of mutual information transfer rate as a function of input noise with a maximum increase in information transfer rate of 150%. For stronger signal amplitudes that stimulated the interneurons in the presence of no noise, however, the addition of noise always decreased the mutual information transfer demonstrating that stochastic resonance only works in the presence of low-intensity signals. The information carried in each spike at different levels of input noise was also calculated. At the optimum level of noise, the cells were more likely to spike, resulting in spikes with more information and more precise temporal coherence with the stimulus.

Stochastic resonance is a possible cause of escape behavior in crickets to attacks from predators that cause pressure waves in the tested frequency range at very low amplitudes, like the wasp Liris niger. Similar effects have also been noted in cockroaches.

=== Cutaneous mechanoreceptors in rats ===
Another investigation of stochastic resonance in broadband (or, equivalently, aperiodic) signals was conducted by probing cutaneous mechanoreceptors in the rat. A patch of skin from the thigh and its corresponding section of the saphenous nerve were removed, mounted on a test stand immersed in interstitial fluid. Slowly adapting type 1 (SA1) mechanoreceptors output signals in response to mechanical vibrations below 500 Hz.

The skin was mechanically stimulated with a broadband pressure signal with varying amounts of broadband noise using the up-and-down motion of a cylindrical probe. The intensity of the pressure signal was tested without noise and then set at a near sub-threshold intensity that would evoke 10 action potentials over a 60-second stimulation time. Several trials were then conducted with noise of increasing amplitude variance. Extracellular recordings were made of the mechanoreceptor response from the extracted nerve.

The encoding of the pressure stimulus in the neural signal was measured by the coherence of the stimulus and response. The coherence was found to be maximized by a particular level of input Gaussian noise, consistent with the occurrence of stochastic resonance.

=== Electroreceptors in paddlefish ===
The paddlefish (Polyodon spathula) hunts plankton using thousands of tiny passive electroreceptors located on its extended snout, or rostrum. The paddlefish is able to detect electric fields that oscillate at 0.5–20 Hz, and large groups of plankton generate this type of signal.

Due to the small magnitude of the generated fields, plankton are usually caught by the paddlefish when they are within 40 mm of the fish's rostrum. An experiment was performed to test the hunting ability of the paddlefish in environments with different levels of background noise. It was found that the paddlefish had a wider distance range of successful strikes in an electrical background with a low level of noise than in the absence of noise. In other words, there was a peak noise level, implying effects of stochastic resonance.

In the absence of noise, the distribution of successful strikes has greater variance in the horizontal direction than in the vertical direction. With the optimal level of noise, the variance in the vertical direction increased relative to the horizontal direction and also shifted to a peak slightly below center, although the horizontal variance did not increase.

Another measure of the increase in accuracy due to the optimal noise background is the number of plankton captured per unit time. For four paddlefish tested, two showed no increase in capture rate, while the other two showed a 50% increase in capture rate.

Separate observations of the paddlefish hunting in the wild have provided evidence that the background noise generated by plankton increase the paddlefish's hunting abilities. Each individual organism generates a particular electrical signal; these individual signals cause massed groups of plankton to emit what amounts to a noisy background signal. It has been found that the paddlefish does not respond to only noise without signals from nearby individual organisms, so it uses the strong individual signals of nearby plankton to acquire specific targets, and the background electrical noise provides a cue to their presence. For these reasons, it is likely that the paddlefish takes advantage of stochastic resonance to improve its sensitivity to prey.

=== Individual model neurons ===
Stochastic resonance was demonstrated in a high-level mathematical model of a single neuron using a dynamical systems approach. The model neuron was composed of a bi-stable potential energy function treated as a dynamical system that was set up to fire spikes in response to a pure tonal input with broadband noise and the SNR is calculated from the power spectrum of the potential energy function, which loosely corresponds to an actual neuron's spike-rate output. The characteristic peak on a plot of the SNR as a function of noise variance was apparent, demonstrating the occurrence of stochastic resonance.

=== Inverse stochastic resonance ===
Another phenomenon closely related to stochastic resonance is inverse stochastic resonance. It happens in the bistable dynamical systems having the limit cycle and stable fixed point solutions. In this case the noise of particular variance could efficiently inhibit spiking activity by moving the trajectory to the stable fixed point. It has been initially found in single neuron models, including classical Hodgkin-Huxley system. Later inverse stochastic resonance has been confirmed in Purkinje cells of cerebellum, where it could play the role for generation of pauses of spiking activity in vivo.

=== Multi-unit systems of model neurons ===
An aspect of stochastic resonance that is not entirely understood has to do with the relative magnitude of stimuli and the threshold for triggering the sensory neurons that measure them. If the stimuli are generally of a certain magnitude, it seems that it would be more evolutionarily advantageous for the threshold of the neuron to match that of the stimuli. In systems with noise, however, tuning thresholds for taking advantage of stochastic resonance may be the best strategy.

A theoretical account of how a large model network (up to 1000) of summed FitzHugh–Nagumo neurons could adjust the threshold of the system based on the noise level present in the environment was devised. This can be equivalently conceived of as the system lowering its threshold, and this is accomplished such that the ability to detect suprathreshold signals is not degraded.

Stochastic resonance in large-scale physiological systems of neurons (above the single-neuron level but below the behavioral level) has been investigated experimentally by Winterer und colleagues: In an electrophysiological study (EEG) of healthy subjects they found that a somewhat increased noise level in brain activity improves information processing as measured by reaction time (Winterer et al. Cortical activation, signal-to-noise ratio and stochastic resonance during information processing in man. Clin Neurophysiol 1999 Jul;110(7):1193-203. doi: 10.1016/s1388-2457(99)00059-0). In subsequent studies, Winterer et al. also showed that very high levels of noise as measured by EEG and functional MRI are found in schizophrenia patients who usually present severe thought disorders. This work constituted the clinical-experimental basis for a computational dynamic attractor model of schizophrenia (Edmund T Rolls, Marco Loh, Gustavo Deco, Georg Winterer. Computational models of schizophrenia and dopamine modulation in the prefrontal cortex. Nature Reviews Neuroscience 2008 Sep;9(9):696-709. doi: 10.1038/nrn2462).

== Human perception ==
Psychophysical experiments testing the thresholds of sensory systems have also been performed in humans across sensory modalities and have yielded evidence that our systems make use of stochastic resonance as well.

=== Vision ===
The above demonstration using the Arc de Triomphe photo is a simplified version of an earlier experiment. A photo of a clocktower was made into a video by adding noise with a particular variance a number of times to create successive frames. This was done for different levels of noise variance, and a particularly optimal level was found for discerning the appearance of the clocktower. Similar experiments also demonstrated an increased level of contrast sensitivity to sine wave gratings.

=== Tactility ===
Human subjects who undergo mechanical stimulation of a fingertip are able to detect a subthreshold impulse signal in the presence of a noisy mechanical vibration. The percentage of correct detections of the presence of the signal was maximized for a particular value of noise.

=== Audition ===
The auditory intensity detection thresholds of a number of human subjects were tested in the presence of noise. The subjects include four people with normal hearing, two with cochlear implants and one with an auditory brainstem implant.

The normal subjects were presented with two sound samples, one with a pure tone plus white noise and one with just white noise, and asked which one contained the pure tone. The level of noise which optimized the detection threshold in all four subjects was found to be between -15 and -20 dB relative to the pure tone, showing evidence for stochastic resonance in normal human hearing.

A similar test in the subjects with cochlear implants only found improved detection thresholds for pure tones below 300 Hz, while improvements were found at frequencies greater than 60 Hz in the brainstem implant subject. The reason for the limited range of resonance effects are unknown. Additionally, the addition of noise to cochlear implant signals improved the threshold for frequency discrimination. The authors recommend that some type of white noise addition to cochlear implant signals could well improve the utility of such devices.
