= Austek Microsystems =

Defunct Australian computer chip maker

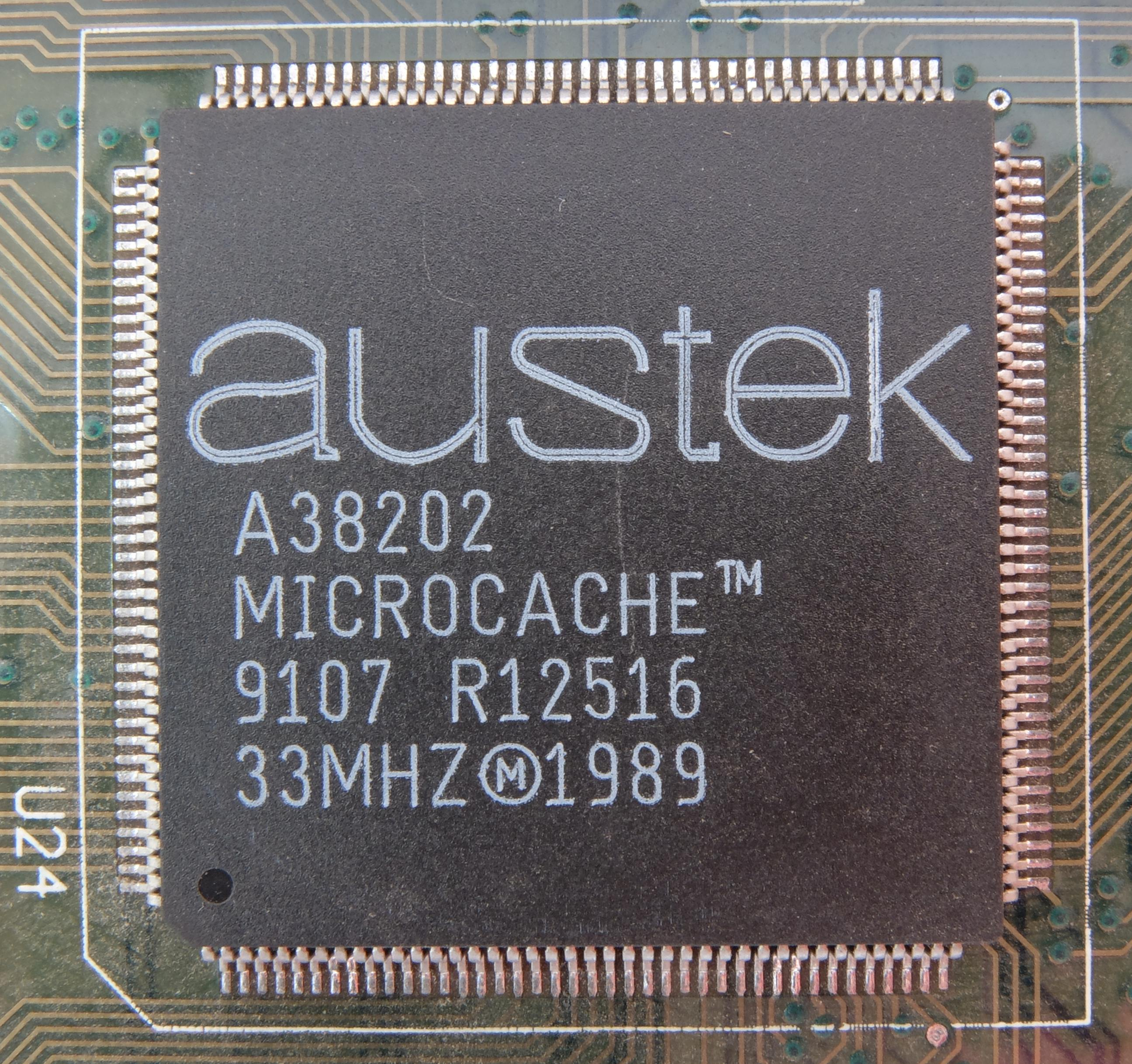
Austek A38202 cache controller integrated circuit

Austek Microsystems Pty. Ltd. (1984–1994) was an Australian company founded by Craig Mudge to commercialize technology developed by CSIRO through their VLSI programme. It had a design office in Adelaide, and a marketing and support office in Silicon Valley.

Austek produced a number of digital signal processing chips, but commercially their most successful products were cache controllers. In 1987 it released the A38152, the world's first single-chip cache controller, to enhance the performance of 80386-based computer systems; it operated at 20 MHz. This was followed in 1989 by the A38202 cache controller, also for 80386-based systems.

Austek however was unable to compete with Intel in the cache controller market. In 1992 the Adelaide design office closed, the headquarters moved to Silicon Valley, and the company attempted to expand into chipsets. The company was wound up in 1994.

Austek provided an environment of innovation, mentoring, design challenges, and experience that later went on to inject expertise to the VLSI industry within Australia and internationally.
