= Noise-based logic =

Class of multivalued deterministic logic schemes

Noise-based logic (NBL) is a class of multivalued deterministic logic schemes, developed in the twenty-first century, where the logic values and bits are represented by different realizations of a stochastic process. The concept of noise-based logic and its name was created by Laszlo B. Kish. In its foundation paper it is noted that the idea was inspired by the stochasticity of brain signals and by the unconventional noise-based communication schemes, such as the Kish cypher.

== The noise-based logic space and hyperspace ==
The logic values are represented by multi-dimensional "vectors" (orthogonal functions) and their superposition, where the orthogonal basis vectors are independent noises. By the proper combination (products or set-theoretical products) of basis-noises, which are called noise-bit, a logic hyperspace can be constructed with D(N) = 2^{N} number of dimensions, where N is the number of noise-bits. Thus N noise-bits in a single wire correspond to a system of 2^{N} classical bits that can express 2^{2^{N}} different logic values. Independent realizations of a stochastic process of zero mean have zero cross-correlation with each other and with other stochastic processes of zero mean. Thus the basis noise vectors are orthogonal not only to each other but they and all the noise-based logic states (superpositions) are orthogonal also to any background noises in the hardware. Therefore, the noise-based logic concept is robust against background noises, which is a property that can potentially offer a high energy-efficiency.

== The types of signals used in noise-based logic ==
In the paper, where noise-based logic was first introduced, generic stochastic-processes with zero mean were proposed and a system of orthogonal sinusoidal signals were also proposed as a deterministic-signal version of the logic system. The mathematical analysis about statistical errors and signal energy was limited to the cases of Gaussian noises and superpositions as logic signals in the basic logic space and their products and superpositions of their products in the logic hyperspace (see also. In the subsequent brain logic scheme, the logic signals were (similarly to neural signals) unipolar spike sequences generated by a Poisson process, and set-theoretical unifications (superpositions) and intersections (products) of different spike sequences. Later, in the instantaneous noise-based logic schemes and computation works, random telegraph waves (periodic time, bipolar, with fixed absolute value of amplitude) were also utilized as one of the simplest stochastic processes available for NBL. With choosing unit amplitude and symmetric probabilities, the resulting random-telegraph wave has 0.5 probability to be in the +1 or in the −1 state which is held over the whole clock period.

== The noise-based logic gates ==
Noise-based logic gates can be classified according to the method the input identifies the logic value at the input. The first gates analyzed the statistical correlations between the input signal and the reference noises. The advantage of these is the robustness against background noise. The disadvantage is the slow speed and higher hardware complexity. The instantaneous logic gates are fast, they have low complexity but they are not robust against background noises. With either neural spike type signals or with bipolar random-telegraph waves of unity absolute amplitude, and randomness only in the sign of the amplitude offer very simple instantaneous logic gates. Then linear or analog devices unnecessary and the scheme can operate in the digital domain. However, whenever instantaneous logic must be interfaced with classical logic schemes, the interface must use correlator-based logic gates for an error-free signal.

== Universality of noise-based logic ==
All the noise-based logic schemes listed above have been proven universal. The papers typically produce the NOT and the AND gates to prove universality, because having both of them is a satisfactory condition for the universality of a Boolean logic.

== Computation by noise-based logic ==
The string verification work over a slow communication channel shows a powerful computing application where the methods is inherently based on calculating the hash function. The scheme is based on random telegraph waves and it is mentioned in the paper that the authors intuitively conclude that the intelligence of the brain is using similar operations to make a reasonably good decision based on a limited amount of information. The superposition of the first D(N) = 2^{N} integer numbers can be produced with only 2N operations, which the authors call "Achilles ankle operation" in the paper.

== Computer chip realization of noise-based logic ==
Preliminary schemes have already been published to utilize noise-based logic in practical computers. However, it is obvious from these papers that this young field has yet a long way to go before it will be seen in everyday applications.
