= Molecular Frontiers Foundation =

Swedish nonprofit organization

The Molecular Frontiers Foundation (MFF) was founded under the auspices of the Royal Swedish Academy of Sciences in 2007 by Bengt Nordén, a professor of physical chemistry at Chalmers University of Technology in Sweden and the former chair of the Nobel Committee for Chemistry. Part of the mission of MFF according to Nordén is to counter the "increasingly bad image that chemistry has in society" and the "decreasing interest in science by the young generation". Founding members of Molecular Frontiers Foundation include Magdalena Eriksson, Lorie Karnath,(founder Molecular Frontiers Journal), Shuguang Zhang (MIT).

The MFF counts eleven Nobel Laureates amongst its 29-member Scientific Advisory Board.

It holds a number of international symposia around the world. May 23, 24, 2017 Stockholm, Sweden Title: Tailored Biology: Fundamental and Medicinal Insights co-chairs Bengt Nordén and Lorie Karnath May 9, 10, 2019 Stockholm, Sweden Title: Planet Earth; A Scientific Journey co-chairs Bengt Nordén and Lorie Karnath. March 6,7, 2023 Berkeley, CA, Title: On the Nature of Water co-chairs Omar Yaghi, Lorie Karnath, Bengt Norden, Douglas Clark, Peidong Yang

Through its science-discussion website "MoleClues", the foundation awards the yearly "Molecular Frontiers Inquiry Prize" also known as the "kid Nobel" to equal numbers of girls and boys from around the world for asking the most penetrating scientific question. The entries are collected online and judged by the MFF Scientific Advisory Board during the annual Spring MFF Youth Forum in the Royal Swedish Academy of Sciences in Stockholm, Sweden.

In April 2023, Lorie Karnath was elected as president of the organization by the Molecular Frontiers Foundation board. The term is for a three year period.
