= Alexandra Olaya-Castro =

Colombian theoretical physicist

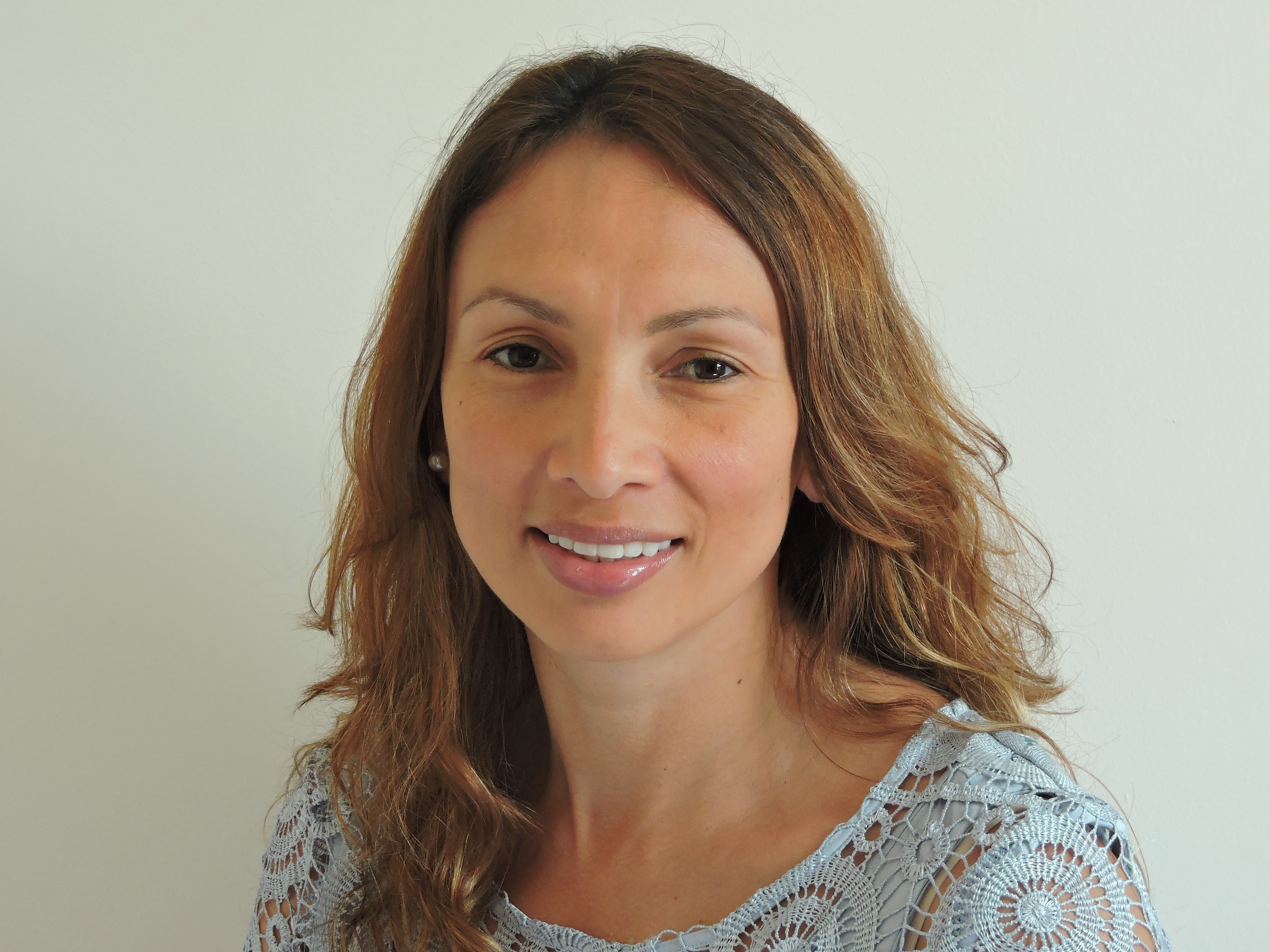
- Born: March 30, 1976 (age 50); Bogotá, Colombia
- Citizenship: Colombian and British
- Education: Universidad Distrital Francisco José de Caldas (BSc); Universidad de los Andes (MSc); University of Oxford (DPhil)
- Known for: Quantum effects in biomolecular processes
- Awards: EPSRC Career Acceleration Fellowship (2008); Maxwell Prize (2016)
- Scientific career
- Fields: Quantum Biology
- Workplaces: University College London
- Thesis: Quantum correlations in multi-qubit-cavity systems (2004)
- Doctoral advisor: Neil F. Johnson
- Website: www.ucl.ac.uk/~ucapaol/aboutAOC.html

Alexandra Olaya-Castro (born March 30, 1976) is a Colombian theoretical physicist, currently a Professor in the Department of Physics and Astronomy at University College London.

She is known for her work on quantum physics on biomolecular processes, specifically for her research on quantum effects in photosynthesis. She was the recipient of the Maxwell Medal in 2016 "for her contributions to the theory of quantum effects in bio-molecular systems".

== Early life and education ==
Olaya-Castro did an undergraduate degree in Physics Education at Universidad Distrital Francisco José de Caldas and later obtained a Master of Science in Physics at Universidad de Los Andes in 2002. She then moved to the UK to pursue a doctorate in physics in the department of physics at the Somerville College, Oxford, where she obtained her DPhil in Physics with her thesis titled “Quantum correlations in multi-qubit-cavity systems” supervised by Neil F. Johnson.

== Research and career ==
Following her DPhil in Quantum Science at the University of Oxford, Olaya-Castro was awarded a Junior Research Fellowship by Trinity College as well at Oxford University from 2005 to 2008. There she began her research in quantum effects in photosynthesis.

In 2008, Olaya-Castro was awarded an EPSRC Career Acceleration Fellowship hosted by University College London where she started an independent research group investigating problems at the interface of Quantum Science and Biology. She obtained a permanent Lecturer position at UCL in 2011 and was promoted to Reader in 2015. In 2016 she became the recipient of the Maxwell and Medal Prize by the Institute of Physics for her contribution to the theoretical understanding of quantum effects in biomolecules. In 2018, Olaya-Castro was promoted to full Professor at UCL and in 2019 she was also appointed as the first vice-Dean for Equality, Diversity and Inclusion in the Mathematical and Physical Sciences.

Olaya-Castro’s current research interests lie in the theoretical understanding of the quantum to classical transition [i.e.] and in how quantum science can contribute to new theoretical and experimental explorations of dynamics and control of biomolecular processes [i.e.].

== Teaching ==
Olaya-Castro teaches the 4th-year course in Advanced Quantum Theory attended by intercollegiate students from University College London, King's College London, Queen Mary University of London and Royal Holloway.

== Public engagement ==
In 2015, she delivered a public talk at the Royal Institution which is available as a podcast.

Olaya-Castro’s research was showcased at the 2016 Royal Society Summer Science Exhibition.

In 2016 Olaya-Castro delivered a TEDx talk advocating for breaking socioeconomic and gender stereotypes through exploring what she calls the option B, the talk in spanish is found here: El poder de la opción B para romper estereotipos.

== Awards and honours ==
In 2003, she was awarded the Arthur H Cooke Memorial Prize for distinguished work by a first year student, Department of Physics, University of Oxford.

In 2005, she won a Junior Research Fellowship at Trinity College, University of Oxford.

In 2008, she was awarded an EPSRC Career acceleration fellowship to pursue independent research.

In 2016, she was awarded the Maxwell Medal and Prize.

In 2024, she was awarded the Freedom of the City of London.

== Selected publications ==
The most cited publications by Olaya-Castro to the date are:

- GD Scholes, GR Fleming, A Olaya-Castro, R Van Grondelle. Lessons from nature about solar light harvesting. (2011) Nature chemistry 3 (10), 763-774
- A Olaya-Castro, CF Lee, FF Olsen, NF Johnson. Efficiency of energy transfer in a light-harvesting system under quantum coherence. (2008) Physical Review B 78 (8), 085115
- GD Scholes, GR Fleming, LX Chen, A Aspuru-Guzik, A Buchleitner. Using coherence to enhance function in chemical and biophysical systems. (2017) Nature 543 (7647), 647-656
- A Kolli, EJ O’Reilly, GD Scholes, A Olaya-Castro. The fundamental role of quantized vibrations in coherent light harvesting by cryptophyte algae. (2012) The Journal of chemical physics 137 (17), 174109
- EJ O’Reilly, A Olaya-Castro. Non-classicality of the molecular vibrations assisting exciton energy transfer at room temperature. (2014) Nature communications 5 (1), 1-10
- A Olaya-Castro, GD Scholes. Energy transfer from Förster–Dexter theory to quantum coherent light-harvesting. (2011) International Reviews in Physical Chemistry 30 (1), 49-77
- F Fassioli, A Olaya-Castro. Distribution of entanglement in light-harvesting complexes and their quantum efficiency. (2010) New Journal of Physics 12 (8), 085006
- F Fassioli, A Nazir, A Olaya-Castro. Quantum state tuning of energy transfer in a correlated environment. (2010)The Journal of Physical Chemistry Letters 1 (14), 2139-2143

== Personal life ==
Olaya-Castro is the mother of two children.
