= Jens Eisert =

German physicist (born 1970)

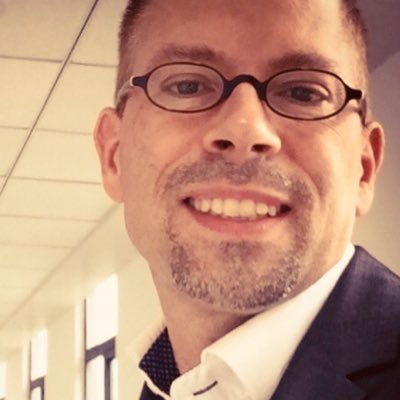
- Born: 9 October 1970 (age 55)
- Education: Imperial College London; University of Potsdam; University of Freiburg; University of Connecticut
- Known for: Quantum information theory
- Awards: ERC Advanced Grant (2023), Google NISQ Award (2019), ERC Consolidator Grant (2012), Berlin Institute for Advanced Study Fellowship (2009–2010), EURYI Award (2004), Michelson Prize (2001), Fulbright Scholarship (1994)
- Scientific career
- Fields: Physics
- Workplaces: Free University of Berlin
- Doctoral advisor: Martin Wilkens

Jens Eisert (born 9 October 1970) is a German physicist, ERC fellow, and professor at the Free University of Berlin. He is also affiliated with the Helmholtz Association and the Fraunhofer Society.

== Scientific work ==
He is known for his research in quantum information science and quantum many-body theory in condensed matter physics. He has made significant contributions to entanglement theory and the study of quantum computing, as well as to the development of protocols in the quantum technologies and to the study of complex quantum systems.

Work on compressed sensing quantum state tomography he has contributed to has been influential for developing notions of benchmarking and the verification of quantum devices to ensure their proper functioning. The concept of a graph state has become a relevant class of multi-qubit quantum states with a number of applications in quantum computing. He has also contributed to understanding how non-Markovian quantum dynamics can be quantified.

In the field of quantum computing, he has been interested in precisely identifying the potential and limitations of near-term and fault tolerant quantum computing, including steps towards achieving an understanding of the impact of noise.

He has contributed to realizing a first dynamical quantum simulator, in joint work with Immanuel Bloch, Ulrich Schollwöck and others, building on his work on non-equilibrium quantum physics. This work has also introduced the idea of benchmarking the performance of quantum devices against that of state-of-the-art classical tensor network methods for classical simulation, an idea that is still much pursued in the quest for achieving a quantum advantage or quantum supremacy, as the situation of quantum devices computationally outperforming classical devices is also referred to. Recent work on Hamiltonian learning for analog quantum simulators has been inspired by similar thoughts on equipping quantum simulators with stronger predictive power.

In quantum many-body theory, he has helped understanding the role of area laws for entanglement entropies in quantum physics that are at the root of the functioning of tensor network methods. He is also notable as one of the co-pioneers of quantum game theory with Maciej Lewenstein and PhD advisor Martin Wilkens.

== Education ==
He attended high school at the Wilhelm von Humboldt Gymnasium, Ludwigshafen, Germany. He obtained his first degree in physics from the University of Freiburg and his master's degree in mathematics and physics from the University of Connecticut under a Fulbright scholarship. In 2001, he obtained his PhD from University of Potsdam under Martin Wilkens with a thesis entitled Entanglement in Quantum Information Theory.

== Career ==
In 2001–2002, he was a Feodor Lynen Fellow at Imperial College London. In 2002–2003, he was a visiting scholar at Caltech. During 2002–2005, he was a junior professor at the University of Potsdam. During the 2005–2008 period he was a lecturer at Imperial College London. In 2008, he became a full professor at the University of Potsdam and in 2011 a full professor at the Free University of Berlin. In 2009–2010, he was a fellow at the Institute for Advanced Study, Berlin.

He is a divisional associate editor of the Physical Review Letters and steering board member of Quantum. He is leading the Einstein Research Unit on Quantum Devices in the Berlin research landscape funded by the Einstein Foundation Berlin and set up by the Berlin University Alliance dedicated to near-term quantum computing. He is also known for consistent contributions to the scientific community, such as being a coauthor of the European quantum technologies roadmap, being a member of the Agenda Quantensysteme consulting the German government, and contributing to outreach activities.
