= David K. Ferry =

American physicist

- Born: 1940 (age 85–86)
- Education: University of Texas at Austin; Texas Technical College
- Scientific career
- Fields: Electronic engineer and physicist
- Workplaces: Texas Tech University; Office of Naval Research; Colorado State University; Arizona State University
- Doctoral advisor: Arwin A. Dougal
- Other academic advisors: Karl-Heinz Seeger
- Doctoral students: Dragica Vasileska

David Keane Ferry (born 1940) is the Regents' Professor of Electrical Engineering at Arizona State University (ASU), notable for his research in semiconductor devices.

== Education ==
He received his BSEE, 1962, and MSEE, 1963, both from Texas Technical College. Ferry obtained his PhD under Arwin A. Dougal, 1966, from the University of Texas at Austin with a thesis entitled Anomalous Microwave Emission from Bulk Semiconductors.

== Career ==
Following a postdoctoral year in Vienna (1966–67) under Karl-Heinz Seeger, he spent time at Texas Tech University (1967–73), the Office of Naval Research (1973–77), Colorado State University (1977–83), and then joined Arizona State University in 1983.

== Honors ==
He has received a number of honours including the IEEE Cledo Brunetti Award, 1999; IEEE (Phoenix) Engineer of Year, 1990; Fellow of the IEEE, 1987; Fellow of the American Physical Society, 1974; and Fellow of the Institute of Physics, 2008. His research involves the physics and simulation of semiconductor devices and quantum effects and transport in mesoscopic device structures.

== Books by Ferry ==
- The Copenhagen Conspiracy (CRC, Taylor & Francis, 2019)
- The Wigner Function in Science and Technology (IOP Publishing, Bristol, 2018)
- An Introduction to Quantum Transport in Semiconductors (Pan Stanford, Singapore, 2018)
- Semiconductors: Bonds and bands (IOP Publishing, Bristol, 2013)
- Quantum Mechanics (Adam Hilger, Bristol, 1995), 2nd Edition (Inst. Physics Publ., London, 2000)
- Quantum Transport in Ultra-small Devices (Plenum, New York, 1995), Edited with Hal Grubin, Carlo Jacoboni, and Antti-Pekka Jauho
- Transport in Nanostructures (Cambridge University Press, Cambridge, 1997), with Steve Goodnick
- Semiconductor Transport (Taylor and Francis, London, 2001)
- Electronic Materials and Devices (Academic Press, San Diego, 2001), with Jon Bird.

== See also ==
- Quantum Aspects of Life (book)
