= Derek Abbott =

British physicist, engineer (born 1960)

- Born: 1960 (age 65–66); South Kensington, London, England
- Citizenship: British, Australian
- Education: Loughborough University; University of Adelaide
- Occupations: Physicist, electronic engineer
- Known for: Parrondo's paradox Stochastics; Terahertz radiations
- Spouse: Rachel Egan (m. 2010)
- Children: 3
- Awards: Laureate Fellow (2024); M. A. Sargent Medal (2019); Barry Inglis Medal (2018); David Dewhurst Medal (2015)
- Scientific career
- Fields: Physics and Electrical & electronic engineering
- Workplaces: University of Adelaide; Austek Microsystems; GEC Hirst Research Centre
- Thesis: GaAs MESFET photodetectors for imaging arrays (1995)
- Doctoral advisors: Kamran Eshraghian; Bruce R. Davis
- Other academic advisors: Michael A. Brown
- Doctoral students: Mark D. McDonnell
- Website: Derek Abbott's Home Page

Derek Abbott (born 1960) is a British-Australian physicist, electronic engineer, and professor at the University of Adelaide.

== Early life and education ==
Derek Abbott was born in South Kensington, London, UK, in 1960.

From 1969 to 1971, he was a boarder at Copthorne Preparatory School, in Surrey. From 1971 to 1978, he attended Holland Park School in London.

== Career ==
In late 1977, Abbott began work at GEC Hirst Research Centre, Wembley, UK, performing research in the area of CCD and microchip design for imaging systems. Whilst working, he graduated in 1982 with a BSc in Physics from Loughborough University.

In 1986, he began work as a microchip designer at Austek Microsystems in Adelaide, Australia. In 1987, he joined the University of Adelaide, completing his PhD thesis in Electrical engineering in 1995, entitled GaAs MESFET Photodetectors for Imaging Arrays, under Kamran Eshraghian and Bruce R. Davis.

He became a fellow of the Institute of Electrical and Electronics Engineers in 2005 "for contributions to analysis of noise and stochastic phenomena in vision systems". He received an Australian Laureate Fellowship in 2024, for ultrasensitive Terahertz radiation detection.

== Somerton man case ==
In March 2009, a University of Adelaide team led by Abbott began an attempt to solve the Somerton Man case involving an unidentified man being found dead near Adelaide in 1948. This involves genetic analysis and proposing to exhume the body to test for DNA. His investigations have led to questions concerning the assumptions police had made on the case. Abbott also tracked down the Barbour waxed cotton of the period and found packaging variations. This may provide clues to the country where it was purchased.

The man was found with a scrap of paper and an apparently encrypted message: decryption was being started from scratch. It had been determined the letter frequency was considerably different from letters written down randomly; the frequency was to be further tested to determine if the alcohol level of the writer could alter random distribution. The format of the code also appeared to follow the quatrain format of the Rubaiyat, supporting the theory that the code was a one-time pad encryption algorithm. Copies of the Rubaiyat, as well as the Talmud and Bible, were being compared to the code using computers to get a statistical base for letter frequencies. However, the code's short length meant the investigators would require the exact edition of the book used. With the original copy lost in the 1960s, researchers have been looking for a FitzGerald edition without success.

An investigation had shown that the Somerton Man's autopsy reports of 1948 and 1949 are now missing and the Barr Smith Library's collection of Cleland's notes do not contain anything on the case. Maciej Henneberg, professor of anatomy at the University of Adelaide, examined images of the Somerton man's ears and found that his cymba (upper ear hollow) is larger than his cavum (lower ear hollow), a feature possessed by only 1–2% of the Caucasian population. In May 2009, Abbott consulted with dental experts who concluded that the Somerton Man had hypodontia (a rare genetic disorder) of both lateral incisors, a feature present in only 2% of the general population. In June 2010, Abbott obtained a photograph of Jessica Thomson's eldest son Robin, which clearly showed that he – like the unknown man – had not only a larger cymba than cavum but also hypodontia. The chance that this was a coincidence has been estimated as between one in 10,000,000 and one in 20,000,000.

The media have suggested that Robin Thomson, who was 16 months old in 1948 and died in 2009, may have been a child of either Alf Boxall or the Somerton Man and passed off as Prosper Thomson's son. DNA testing would confirm or eliminate this speculation. Abbott believes an exhumation and an autosomal DNA test could link the Somerton man to a shortlist of surnames which, along with existing clues to the man's identity, would be the "final piece of the puzzle". However, in October 2011, Attorney General John Rau refused permission to exhume the body, stating: "There needs to be public interest reasons that go well beyond public curiosity or broad scientific interest."

Feltus said he was still contacted by people in Europe who believed the man was a missing relative but did not believe an exhumation and finding the man's family grouping would provide answers to relatives, as "during that period so many war criminals changed their names and came to different countries".

In July 2013, Abbott released an artistic impression he commissioned of the Somerton man, believing this might finally lead to an identification. "All this time we've been publishing the autopsy photo, and it's hard to tell what something looks like from that", Abbott said.

In December 2017, Abbott announced three "excellent" hairs "at the right development stage for extracting DNA" had been found on the plaster cast of the corpse, and had been submitted for analysis to the Australian Centre for Ancient DNA at the University of Adelaide. Processing the results could reportedly take up to a year. In February 2018, the University of Adelaide team obtained a high definition analysis of the mitochondrial DNA from the hair sample from Somerton Man. They found that he and his mother belonged to haplogroup H4a1a1a, which is possessed by only 1% of Europeans.

On 26 July 2022, Abbott announced that he and American genealogist Colleen Fitzpatrick had used DNA websites such as Ancestry.com to build a family tree of over 4,000 people. In March 2022, they narrowed this to Melbourne man Carl "Charles" Webb, an electrical engineer and instrument maker, who had no death record. Abbott said that on 23 July, "the final pieces of DNA proof were found to fully identify Webb as the Somerton Man." South Australia Police and Forensic Science South Australia said they had not verified Abbott's findings, and that further comment would be provided "when results from the testing are received."

== Personal life ==
After initially contacting her to seek her DNA, Abbott married Rachel Egan in 2010, and they have three children.
