= Texas Instruments personal computer =

Texas Instruments personal computer, TI PC, TI home computer, and similar phrases may refer to:

- TI-99/4A and TI-99/4, the first 16-bit home computers (1979–1983)
- Compact Computer 40, a small portable computer introduced in 1983
- Texas Instruments Professional Computer (TIPC or TI PC), a personal computer that used the DOS operating system but was not fully compatible with the IBM PC (1983 – c. 1985)
- Texas Instruments Professional Portable Computer, a contemporaneous portable version of the TI Professional Computer
