= Chipspeech =

Vocal synthesizer software

- Screenshot of the word creation tab with Dandy 704 loaded
- Developer: Plogue Art et Technologie, Inc.
- Initial release: 14 January 2015; 11 years ago
- Stable release: 1.778 / 9 May 2024; 2 years ago
- Operating system: Windows 10 or later, macOS 10.13 or later, Linux kernel 5.4 or later
- Available in: English, Japanese
- Type: Voice synthesizer
- License: Proprietary
- Website: plogue.com/products/chipspeech.html

Chipspeech is a singing vocal synthesizer software application and plugin created by Plogue that recreates the vocals of several 1980s speech synthesis chips from early home computers and video games.

== About ==
The software is used for creating vocals for use within music. Chipspeech is designed to produce vintage-style vocals from synthesizers that were used by the music industry in the 1980s, having a cut off date of 1989 technology. The vocals, therefore, are not meant to sound realistic and are more suited for sound experimentation. It works as a text-to-speech method. Users type the lyrics in and receive instant playback results which was a capability beyond the original soundchips the software vocals are based on. The software is as simple as Vocaloid. Though English and Japanese come as standard, other languages can be created by direct entry of syllables. Though human-like vocals can be achieved, the results are always machine-like rather than man-like. It is capable of different synthesis methods or re-samplers. In addition for 1.032 version of the software a new "Speak and Spell" program was added creating the circuit bending feature.

Chipspeech itself as created as a result of research for Chipsounds by Plogue in the 2000s. David Viens himself would often collect sound chips even if there was no need for them. This obsession eventually lead to further events which resulted in the creation of the Chipspeech software after he spent years hacking, protoboard making, probing, and reverse engineering the speech chips. He noted that the software's main goal was to be a singing emulator and not a text-to-speech software. The source data of each vocal is 8 kHz or 10 kHz. Despite all their effort, the project came to a halt. Hubert Lamontagne joined Plogue with knowledge of phonetics and digital signal processing, Hubert took interest in creating a vintage-sounding synthesizer, and designed the synthesizer to work beyond being a sound library.

It originally came with 7 "characters" upon purchase. Since then, more vocals have been and continue to be added. These characters come with their own backstory and are based on a sound synthesizer. Recreation of these voices was done with permission from their respective license holders. Plogue itself gained rights to the speech data from three TI-99/4A games (Alpiner, Parsec and Moon Mine), and the internal vocabulary of the TI Speech Device. The process of gaining right for the vocals took over 10 years, as the company did not want to disrespect the copyright holders even when met with issues such as the license holder having gone bankrupt. And while the technology was easy to emulate, the data needed for the emulation was not.

In January 2016, Plogue announced that Hubert Lamontagne had found a way to improve quality. On 9 February, Version 1.066 was released. This fixed bugs with Deeklatt and Otto Mozer. Voice improvements to Dandy 704 and Bert Gotrax were scheduled for the next release and were updated in 1.072. Some vocals such as Dandy 704 are restricted by how far they can be improved. In addition, Chipspeech will be receiving the ability to talk as well as sing in its next major update. Chipspeech also was exported to Japan during June 2016.

Version 1.5 was released on 16 September 2016 adding talk capabilities, a growl adjustment and two new vocals "Rotten.ST" and "CiderTalk'84" based on the 16 bit era vocals.

In 2017, the Voder and Software Automatic Mouth were announced to be added to the software later that year.

== Albums ==
An official album was created featuring the software. The album is titled "chipspeech AUTOMATE SONGS .01" and includes a cover of the song Stakker Humanoid using Otto Mozer, whose vocal is an emulation of the same synthesizer used for the samples taken from the arcade game Berzerk.

The 2015 album Garden of Delete by American electronic producer Oneohtrix Point Never utilizes Chipspeech.

== Characters ==
sd_bbb
The song sd_bbb by Patricia Taxxon, using the Bert Gotrax voice

The vocals are split between a number of characters, in addition, Daisy from Alter/Ego could be imported into the software;

- Bert Gotrax: This is a vocal based on the Votrax SC-01 device. Bert Gotrax is characterized as defiant and rebellious.
- Lady Parsec: She is based on the TI-99/4A plug-in speech synthesizer module and named after the video game Parsec. Lady Parsec is a sarcastic, omnipotent dictator. She has two vocal modes, "Lady Parsec" and "Lady Parsec HD", unlike other characters.
- Otto Mozer: Based on the TSI S14001A and Forrest S. Mozer's work. He is described on Plogue's website as a mad scientist and cyborg.
- Dandy 704: based on the IBM 704 computer.
- Dee Klatt: Based on Dectalk. Dee Klatt is described as "a wise and mild-mannered android."
- Spencer AL2: Based on the SP0256-AL2 chip.
- Terminal 99: Also based on the TI-99/4A plug-in speech synthesizer module. Terminal 99 is described as a heavily modified, supernatural TI 99/4A computer.
- VOSIM: based on a Standard DAC. He was the additional 8th vocal that was released on May 27, 2015.
- CiderTalk'84: Based on the original MacInTalk 1.0. Dr. CiderTalk'84 is described as being charismatic and infinitely intelligent, but lacking any concrete accomplishments.
- Rotten.ST: based on Atari ST's STSPEECH.TOS. Rotten.ST is characterized as a rebellious criminal.
- SAM: Based on Software Automatic Mouth's synthesizer technology.
- Voder: Based on the Bell Labs Voder.

== Reception ==
Reception to the software was mostly positive. It won 3 Computer Music awards; Editor's Choice, Performance and Innovation. The software was described as a polished product at their MusicRadar review and noted as "tons of fun to use".

AskAudio in their "Voice of the Machines" review focused on the fact that with the raise of Autotuning software, a human is always required. Chipspeech allowed a nostalgic approach to vocal synthesizing with its resulting vocals coming purely from a computer. It listed the positives of the software as " Incredibly unique, fairly easy to use, sounds excellent, affordable" but noted as its main weakness was how the software strained the CPU.

CDM, who had been given exclusive early access-to the software, also highlighted how "boring" modern synthesizers had become and focused on the "fun" that the software provided. One of its highlighted merits of the software was how rare some historical chips it aimed to recreate had become.

In August 2016, Chipspeech topped the virtual instrument top 25 rankings at Sonicwire, owned by Crypton Future Media, beating their Vocaloids products such as Hatsune Miku which normally dominated their rankings.
