= TIPC =

TIPC may refer to:

- Taiwan International Ports Corporation, state-owned shipping company of Taiwan
- Texas Instruments Professional Computer, a computer similar to (but not compatible with) the IBM PC
  - Texas Instruments Professional Portable Computer a portable version of the Texas Instruments Professional Computer
- Transparent Inter-process Communication, an inter-process communication service in Linux
