= Parsec (video game) =

1982 video game

- Developers: Jim Dramis; Paul Urbanus
- Publisher: Texas Instruments
- Platform: TI-99/4A
- Release: 1982
- Genre: Scrolling shooter

Parsec is a horizontally scrolling shooter written by Jim Dramis and Paul Urbanus for the TI-99/4A and published by Texas Instruments in 1982. Dramis also programmed Car Wars and Munch Man for the TI-99/4A.

== Gameplay ==
The ship moving through a refueling tunnel

The player in Parsec pilots a spaceship through sixteen differently colored levels which scroll horizontally across the screen. The objective is to destroy all enemy ships while avoiding being shot, colliding with any flying object or the ground, or overheating one's laser cannon.

Three waves of fighters alternate with three waves of cruisers; fighters pose only the threat of collision, while the cruisers fire on the player's ship. Enemy ships enter the screen one at a time. A new fighter can appear with others still on the screen, whereas a new cruiser will not come until the previous one is destroyed. A ship flying off the left edge of the screen wraps around to the right side and attacks again. The fighter types are named Swoopers, LTFs (Light Triangular Fighters), and Saucers. The cruisers are called Urbites, Dramites, and Bynites. Each level ends with an asteroid belt, in which an array of asteroids advance on the ship and must be avoided or shot. At the end of each asteroid belt, any remaining asteroids are cleared away and the color of the ground is changed; then a new wave of Swoopers begins. Starting with level 4, the Swoopers are preceded by a random number of Killer Satellites, which come without the usual computer warning.

The Urbites and Dramites appear to be named after the developers of the game; Paul Urbanus signed Internet posts as late as 2005 as "urbite". The Bynites were likely named after Don Bynum, the manager of TI's Personal Computer Division.

== Speech ==
The optional speech synthesis adds drama to the gameplay. Although it warns of advancing enemy craft and low fuel, both of these also have visual cues. The sole exception is in the asteroid belts between levels, whose length increases with the level number. There is a spoken countdown for each asteroid belt. Without the speech synthesizer there is no indication of how long the asteroid belt will last.

The voice of the on-board computer was performed by Aubree Anderson, who at the time was a student at Texas Tech University.

== Legacy ==
The speech data for Parsec, Alpiner and Moon Mine was later acquired by Plogue Art et Technologie, Inc. The data for all three games was used for the software Chipspeech to create the voice of character "Lady Parsec".
