= List of TI-99/4A games =

This is a list of video games published for the TI-99/4A home computer and its predecessor, the TI-99/4.

There are 330 commercial games on this list.

Name	Year	Publisher
007: Aqua Base	1982	American Software Design & Distribution
3-D Maze	1981	American Software Design & Distribution
99'Vaders	1983	Not-Polyoptics
Addvance	1981	Not-Polyoptics
Adventure	1981	Texas Instruments
Adventureland	1981	Texas Instruments
Alien Addition	1982	DLM
Alligator Mix	1982	DLM
Alpiner	1982	Texas Instruments
A-Maze-Ing	1980	Texas Instruments
Ambulance	1983	Funware
Angler Dangler	1983	Data East USA
Ant Colony	1983	Funware
Ant Wars	1981	Not-Polyoptics
Ant-Eater	1983	Romox
Arcademic Skillbuilder: Alien Addition	1982	DLM Developmental Learning Materials
Arcademic Skillbuilder: Alligator Mix	1982	DLM Developmental Learning Materials
Arcademic Skillbuilder: Dragon Mix	1982	DLM Developmental Learning Materials
Archeodroid	1985	Emerald Valley Publishing
Astro Fighter	1983	Data East USA
Astromania	1982	Moonbeam Software
Aztec Challenge	1982	Cosmi Corporation
B-1 Nuclear Bomber	1983	Avalon Hill
Backgammon	1984	Texas Instruments
Ballyhoo	1986	Infocom
Bankroll: The Investment Game	1984	Not-Polyoptics
Barnyard Fun	1981	American Software Design & Distribution
Barrage	1983	Sofmachine
Beneath the Stars	1984	Intrigue Software
Bigfoot	1983	Texas Instruments
Bird Brain	1984	Emerald Valley Publishing
Black Box	1982	Stainless Software
Black Hole	1983	DaTaBioTics
Blackbeard's Treasure	1982	Millers Graphics; Timeless Software
Blackjack & Poker	1981	Texas Instruments
Blasto	1980	Milton Bradley
Bomb Squad	1981	American Software Design & Distribution
Bouncer	1983	Extended Software Company
Boxer	1987	DaTaBioTics
Break Thru	1989	DaTaBioTics
Buck Rogers: Planet of Zoom	1983	Texas Instruments
Burger Builder	1983	DaTaBioTics
BurgerTime	1984	Data East USA
Cannonball Blitz	1982	Sierra On-Line
Car Wars	1981	Texas Instruments
Card Sharp	Unknown	Milton Bradley
Cars & Carcasses 2	1981	Not-Polyoptics
Castle Darkholm	1990	Asgard Software
Cave Creatures	1983	Funware
Centipede	1983	Atarisoft
Championship Baseball	1983	Texas Instruments
Chicken Coop	1986	Navarone
Chisholm Trail	1982	Texas Instruments
Circle World	1983	Aardvark-80; The Guild Adventure Software
Computer Bible Games	1984	Accent Publications
Computer Math Games I	1983	Addison-Wesley Publishing
Computer Math Games II	1982	Addison-Wesley Publishing
Computer Math Games III	1983	Addison-Wesley Publishing
Computer Math Games IV	1983	Addison-Wesley Publishing
Computer Math Games VI	1982	Addison-Wesley Publishing
Computer War	1983	Thorn EMI Video
Congo Bongo	1983	Texas Instruments
Connect Four	1980	Milton Bradley
Cosmopoly	1983	Not-Polyoptics
Crosses	1983	Not-Polyoptics
Crossfire	1983	Sierra On-Line
Cutthroats	Unknown	Infocom
Deadline	Unknown	Infocom
Death Ship	1983	Aardvark Technical Services; Robtek
Defender	1983	Atarisoft
Demolition Division	1982	DLM Developmental Learning Materials
Demon Attack	1983	Imagic
Derelict	1983	Aardvark-80
Devil's Island	1982	Apex Trading
Diablo	1983	Extended Software Company
Diagnostic	1979	Texas Instruments
Dig Dug	1983	Atarisoft
Division 1	1982	Foresman &, Scott
Donkey Kong	1983	Atarisoft
Dragon Mix	1983	DLM
Driving Demon	1983	Funware
D-Station I	1988	DaTaBioTics
D-Station II - The Conflict Continues!	1988	DaTaBioTics
Dungeon Key	1983	ALA Software
E.T.	1982	Texas Instruments
Early Games: Matchmaker	1983	Counterpoint Software
Early Learning Fun	1982	Texas Instruments
Early LOGO Learning Fun	1982	Texas Instruments
Earthquake	1983	Aardvark-80; Mogul Communications
Echecs	1979	Texas Instruments
Electronic Party	1983	Scholastic
Enchanter	Unknown	Infocom
Escape	1984	DaTaBioTics
Espial	1983	Tigervision
Face Chase	1984	Video Magic
Fantasy	1983	Texas Instruments
Fathom	1983	Imagic
Fly Snuffer	1983	Futura Software
Football	1979	Texas Instruments
Forbidden City	1982	Apex Trading; Phoenix Publishing Associates
Frog Jump	1983	Foresman &, Scott
Frog Stickers	1982	Navarone
Frogger	1984	Parker Bros.
Fun House	1982	American Software Design & Distribution
Galaxy	1979	Avalon Hill
Germ Patrol	1983	Texas Instruments
Gestion Privee	1983	Texas Instruments
Ghost Town	1981	Texas Instruments
Hangman	1981	Milton Bradley
Haunted House	1982	American Software Design & Distribution
Hebdogiciel Software - TI-99 4/A No.1	Unknown	Shift Editions
Hebdogiciel Software - TI-99 4/A No.2	Unknown	Shift Editions
Hebdogiciel Software - TI-99 4/A No.3: Le Rubis Sacre	Unknown	Shift Editions
Hebdogiciel Software - TI-99 4/A No.4	Unknown	Shift Editions
Hebdogiciel Software - TI99/4A No. 5: Les 7 Sorciers	Unknown	Shift Editions
Hen Pecked	1983	Romox
Henhouse	1982	Funware
Hollywood Hijinx	1987	Infocom
Honey Hunt	1983	Milton Bradley
Hopper	1983	Texas Instruments
Hordes	1981	Not-Polyoptics
Household Budget Management	1979	Texas Instruments
Hunt The Wumpus	1980	Texas Instruments
Hustle	1980	Texas Instruments
I'm Hiding	1983	Milton Bradley
In Search of: The Four Vedas	1982	American Software Design & Distribution
Infidel	Unknown	Infocom
Island Adventure	1982	Apex Trading
Jawbreaker II	1983	Sierra On-Line
Jet Storm	1983	ALA Software
Jumpy	1983	Sofmachine
Jungle Hunt	1983	Atarisoft
Jungle King	1982	Taito
Jungle Quest	1984	Scholastic
Junkman Junior	1986	DaTaBioTics
Karate Challenge	1989	Asgard Software
Khe Sanh	1981	Not-Polyoptics
King of the Castle	1984	Navarone
Land on Mars	1981	American Software Design & Distribution
Laser Shield	1981	American Software Design & Distribution
Laser Tank	1983	Not-Polyoptics
Lasso	1983	Texas Instruments
Lazer Maze	1982	Avant-Garde Creations
Leather Goddesses of Phobos	1986	Infocom
Lobster Bay	1983	Funware
M.A.S.H	1983	Fox Video Games
Mancala	1983	DaTaBioTics
Mars	1983	Aardvark Technical Services
Maze of Ariel	1981	Not-Polyoptics
Mean Streets	1983	Alpha Software
Meteor Belt	1983	Milton Bradley
Meteor Multiplication	1982	DLM Developmental Learning Materials
Meteor Shower	1981	American Software Design & Distribution
Micro Adventure No. 1: Space Attack	1984	Scholastic
Micro Adventure No. 3: Million Dollar Gamble	1984	Scholastic
Micro Adventure No. 4: Time Trap	1984	Scholastic
Micro Adventure No. 5: Mindbenders	1984	Scholastic
Micro Adventure No. 6: Robot Race	1984	Scholastic
Micro Pinball	1984	Software Specialties
Micro Pinball 2	1984	Software Specialties
Micro Tennis	1983	DaTaBioTics
Microsurgeon	1983	Imagic
Midnite Mason	1984	Software Specialties
Mind Challengers	1980	Texas Instruments
Mind Master	1979	Image Computer Products
Miner 2049er	1983	Tigervision
Miner 49'er	1982	American Software Design & Distribution
Mini Memory	1981	Texas Instruments
Minus Mission	1982	DLM Developmental Learning Materials
Mission Impossible	1981	Texas Instruments
Mission X	1983	Data East USA
Moon Mine	1983	Texas Instruments
Moon Patrol	1983	Atarisoft
Moonsweeper	1983	Imagic
Mousk-Attack	1983	Sierra On-Line
Mr. Frog	1981	American Software Design & Distribution
Ms. Pac-Man	1983	Atarisoft
Munch Man	1982	Texas Instruments
Munch Mobile	1983	Texas Instruments
MunchMan	1982	Texas Instruments
Mystery Fun House	1981	Texas Instruments
Newton's Revenge	1983	Futura Software
Nuclear Submarine Adventure	1980	Aardvark Technical Services
Oldies But Goodies-Games I	Unknown	Texas Instruments
Oldies But Goodies-Games II	Unknown	Texas Instruments
Oliver's Twist	1988	Asgard Software
Ophyss	1982	Not-Polyoptics
Othello	1982	CBS Video
Pac-Man	1983	Atarisoft
Paddleball	1983	Texas Instruments
Parsec	1982	Texas Instruments
Peter Pan's Space Odyssey	1984	Disney
Pharaoh's Curse	1982	Apex Trading
Picnic Paranoia	1983	Atarisoft
Pinocchio's Great Escape	1984	Disney
Pirate Adventure	1981	Adventure International
Planetfall	Unknown	Infocom
Pole Position	1983	Atarisoft
Popeye	1984	Parker Bros.
Princess and Frog	1982	Romox
Protector II	1983	Atarisoft
Pulsar	1983	C. A. Root Associates
Pyramid	1983	Aardvark Action Software; Mogul Communications
Pyramid of Doom	1981	Texas Instruments
Pyramid Puzzler	1983	Foresman &, Scott
Q*bert	1984	Parker Bros.
Quest	1981	Aardvark Technical Services
Rabbit Trail	1983	Romox
Rattlesnake Bend	1989	Asgard Software
Reading Adventures	1983	Foresman &, Scott
Reading Cheers	1983	Foresman &, Scott
Reading Flight	1982	Foresman &, Scott
Reading Fun	1982	Foresman &, Scott
Reading On	1982	Foresman &, Scott
Reading Power	1983	Foresman &, Scott
Reading Rainbows	1982	Foresman &, Scott
Reading Rally	1982	Foresman &, Scott
Reading Roundup	1982	Foresman &, Scott
Reading Trail	1983	Foresman &, Scott
Reading Wonders	1983	Foresman &, Scott
Return to Pirate's Isle	1983	Texas Instruments
River Rescue	1983	Thorn EMI Video
River Rescue: Racing Against Time	1982	Creative Sparks
Robopods	1983	Virgin Games
Robotron:	1983	Atarisoft
Rock Runner	1990	Asgard Software
Rotor Raiders	1983	Romox
Saguaro City	1981	Texas Instruments
Savage Island Series	1981	Adventure International
Schachmeister	1979	Texas Instruments
Schnoz-ola	1983	Funware
School Mailer	1981	Foresman &, Scott
Secret Mission	1979	Adventure International
Sengoku Jidai	1981	Not-Polyoptics
Sewermania	1983	Milton Bradley
Shamus	1983	Atarisoft
Shanghai	1983	Funware
Ships!	1981	Not-Polyoptics
Simon Says	1983	Texas Instruments
Ski	1981	American Software Design & Distribution
Slinky	1983	Cosmi Corporation
Slymoids	1983	Texas Instruments
Sneggit	1982	Texas Instruments
Soccer	1980	Texas Instruments
Sorcerer	Unknown	Infocom
Sorcerer of Claymorgue Castle	1984	Adventure International
Sorgan II	1988	DaTaBioTics
Soundtrack Trolley	1983	Milton Bradley
Space Bandits	1983	Milton Bradley
Space Battle 2056	1981	American Software Design & Distribution
Space Journey	1983	Foresman &, Scott
Space Patrol	1983	Sunware
SPAD XIII	1987	Not-Polyoptics
Spectrum	1984	Sunburst Communications
Spellbreaker	1985	Infocom
Spider Invasion	1982	Cosmi Corporation
Springer	1983	Tigervision
Spy's Demise	1987	CSI Design Group
Square Pairs	1983	Scholastic
St. Nick	1983	Funware
Star Gazer I	1984	Video Magic
Star Gazer II	1984	Video Magic
Star Gazer III	1984	Video Magic
Star Maze	1983	Foresman &, Scott
Star Runner	1987	DaTaBioTics
Star Trek: Strategic Operations Simulator	1983	Texas Instruments
Starcross	Unknown	Infocom
Starship Pegasus	1981	Not-Polyoptics
Stone Age	1982	American Software Design & Distribution
Story Machine	1983	Spinnaker
Strange Odyssey	1981	Texas Instruments
Strategy Pack I	1979	Image Computer Products
Submarine Battle	1982	Texas Instruments
Submarine Commander	1983	Thorn EMI Video
Super Demon Attack	1983	Imagic
Super Duper	1984	Navarone
Super Sketch	1984	Personal Peripherals
Super Storm	1983	Atarisoft
Superfly	1983	Milton Bradley
SuperSpace II	1986	DaTaBioTics
Suspect	1984	Infocom
Suspended	Unknown	Infocom
Tennis	1983	Nicesoft
Terry Turtle's Adventure	1984	Milton Bradley
Testtrainer 1	1981	Texas Instruments
The Attack	1980	Texas Instruments
The Count	1981	Texas Instruments
The Golden Voyage	1981	Texas Instruments
The HitchHiker's Guide to the Galaxy	Unknown	Infocom
The Market	1979	Image Computer Products
The Secret Agent	1984	Stainless Software
The Wall	1984	Stainless Software
The Witness	Unknown	Infocom
The Wizard's Dominion	1982	American Software Design & Distribution
The Wizard's Tower	1982	Aardvark Action Software
TI Invaders	1981	Texas Instruments
Tickworld	1981	Not-Polyoptics
Tile Breaker	Unknown	Magic Soft.
TI-Toad	1982	Software Specialties
Tombstone City: 21st Century	1981	Texas Instruments
Topper	1983	Navarone
Tornado Challenge	1983	ALA Software
Torpedo Alley	1985	Emerald Valley Publishing
Tower: Civilian Air Traffic Controller	1984	Stainless Software
Treasure Island	1983	Data East USA
Treasure Trap	1983	Not-Polyoptics
Trek Adventure	1980	Aardvark Technical Services; Grandstand Leisure
Tunnels of Doom	1982	Texas Instruments
Typo II	1983	Romox
Verb Viper	1982	DLM Developmental Learning Materials
Video Chess	1979	Texas Instruments
Video Games 1	1979	Texas Instruments
Video Vegas	1982	Romox
Video-Graphs	1979	Texas Instruments
Von Drake's Molecular Mission	1984	Disney
Voodoo Castle	1981	Texas Instruments
Waldoball	1983	Not-Polyoptics
Wildcatting	1979	The Image Producers
Wing War	1983	Imagic
Winging It	1981	Not-Polyoptics
Wishbringer	1985	Infocom
Witch's Brew	1989	Asgard Software
Word Invasion	1982	DLM Developmental Learning Materials
Word Radar	1982	DLM Developmental Learning Materials
Yahtzee	1980	Milton Bradley
Zero Zap	1981	Milton Bradley
Zoom Flume	1989	Asgard Software
Zork I - The Great Underground Empire	Unknown	Infocom
Zork II - The Wizard of Frobozz	Unknown	Infocom
Zork III - The Dungeon Master	Unknown	Infocom
