= Chisholm Trail (video game) =

1982 video game

- Developer(s): Texas Instruments
- Publisher(s): Texas Instruments
- Programmer(s): John C. Plaster
- Platform(s): TI-99/4A
- Release: 1982
- Genre(s): Action
- Mode(s): Single-player

Chisholm Trail is a video game released in July 1982 by Texas Instruments for its TI-99/4A home computer. It was written by John C. Plaster, who previously wrote Tombstone City: 21st Century for the TI-99/4A.

== Gameplay ==
Players take the role of a cattle driver on the Chisholm Trail, bringing their cattle to set destinations while defending them against cattle rustlers and wranglers. The game has nine levels. The level selected determines how long the player has been on the trail, how many steers and shots the player has, and how many wranglers and rustlers must be eliminated. Wranglers are in the form of brands and will try to brand the steers for themselves. Mileage counts as the score and Rustlers are worth 250 miles and Wranglers are 150 miles. Every time 10,000 miles is reached another steer is added to the group.
