= Chisholm Trail (disambiguation) =

Chisholm Trail was a trail in the post-American Civil War era to drive cattle overland from ranches in Texas to Kansas railheads.

It may also refer to:

== Roads ==
- Chisholm Trail Parkway in Texas

== Cycleways ==
- Chisholm Trail (Cambridge), a walking and cycling route in Cambridge, England

== Schools ==
- Chisholm Trail High School in Fort Worth, Texas
- Chisholm Trail Academy, co-educational high school in Keene, Texas

== Games ==
- Chisholm Trail (video game), a computer game released in 1982

== See also ==
- Chisholm (disambiguation)
