= Henhouse (video game) =

1983 video game

- Publisher: Funware
- Platform: TI-99/4A
- Release: 1983

Henhouse is a 1983 video game produced by Funware for the TI-99/4A home computer.

In 1983, there were three companies interested in buying out Funware: Activision, Epyx, and Creative Software. Funware was eventually sold to Creative Software. However, both Epyx and Activision would later market TI-99/4A games independently near the end of 1983. According to Michael Brouthers, it only cost Funware US$4 to make each game cartridge.

== Gameplay ==
The object is to collect the eggs as they drop from the henhouse and carry them to the truck while you shoot the two- and four-legged predators that stalk the henhouse.
