= John Fekner =

American artist

- Born: John Fekner; October 6, 1950 (age 75); New York City, U.S.
- Education: NYIT Lehman College
- Known for: Art, Multimedia, Poetry, Music, Video

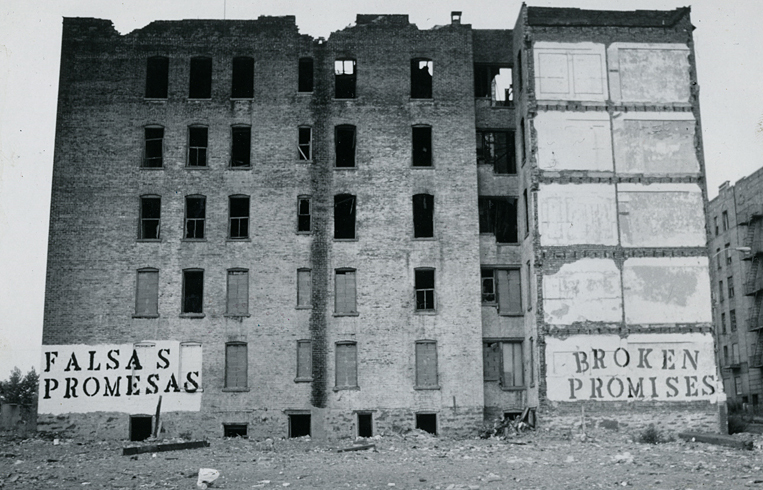

John Fekner (born 1950) is an American artist known for his spray painted environmental and conceptual outdoor works.

Fekner's has created paintings, cast paper reliefs, video, music recordings and performance works, sculpture, photography and computer-generated work. Fekner has addressed issues involving concepts of perception and transformation, as well as specific environmental and sociological concerns such as urban decay, greed, chemical pollutants, mass media and Native American Indians. The street art and stencil graffiti pionier Fekner is one of the first artists who painted uncommissioned works in public space that were of huge size. Before people talked about street art Fekner labeled himself "environmental conceptual artist".

== Early life ==
Fekner began writing poetry as a young teenager, and his first outdoor graffiti in 1968 were the words Itchycoo Park painted at Gorman Park 85th Street Park in Jackson Heights, Queens. Along with his accomplices on the park house roof, he painted the phrase in large white letters across the front of the building. Fekner appropriated the name of the popular hit written and recorded by the Small Faces about a park in Newham, England. Subsequently, the Jackson Heights local football team took the name, Itchycoo Chiefs in the 1970s. Ten years later, Fekner used the park as a base for his stencils projects. In May 1978, he curated the Detective Show with help from the Institute for Art and Urban Resources (P.S. 1). A group of thirty artists including Gordon Matta-Clark, Don Leicht, Len Bellinger, Lucio Pozzi, Lou Forgione, Richard Artschwager, Frances Hynes, Karen Shaw and Claudia De Monte hid art and created subtle art work in situ throughout the park.

== Stencil works ==
In 1976, Fekner began to spray paint temporary messages onto buildings in New York City using hand-cut cardboard stencils and spray paint. First seen on the industrial streets and highways of Queens, the East River bridges, and later in the South Bronx, his signs (such as Industrial Fossil, Urban Decay and Decay/Abandoned) were spray painted in areas that were in need of construction, demolition or reconstruction. The projects succeeded when the existing condition was removed or remedied.

In February 1980, Fekner began working in, around, and out of Fashion Moda, a storefront for experimental art and cultural exchange, and an outpost for showcasing graffiti, breakdancing and rapping. I

In 1982, Fekner curated From The Monkey To The Monitor which featured his NOTV4U2C wall mural and audio loop installation, Don Leicht's metal Space Invaders, Fred Baca's drawings and a live performance by Phoebe Legere.

In 1968, he painted the words Itchycoo Park in large white letters on an empty building in Gorman Park, New York.

In 1978, he curated the Detective Show at the same outdoor location in Queens which included the words street museum on the invitational card. In reaction to the desolation of the abandoned burnt-out buildings of the South Bronx, Fekner stenciled Last Hope in large letters above one crumbling structure.

In 1981, Martin Nisenholtz invited Fekner, Andy Warhol, Keith Haring and John Matos/Crash to experiment on the early interactive teletext system Telidon at NYU's Alternate Media Center, the predecessor of its Interactive Telecommunications Program. Fekner received his first international award at Toronto's Video Culture Festival in the Videotex category for Toxic Wastes From A to Z, an 8-bit computer graphics animation created at AMC which featured a rap by K-8 students from a South Bronx school.

== Collaborations ==
Fekner began collaborating with Bronx artist Don Leicht at PS1 now called MoMA PS1 where they shared a studio in 1976. In 1982, they began a series of work and installations using steel, cut metal, aluminum and automotive paints based on Nishikado's Space Invaders arcade game with the statement: "Your Space Has Been Invaded-Our Children are Fighting a Terrible War. Whole families are being sent to Battlescreen." Their "Beauty's Only Street Deep" was installed at the Wooster Collective's 11 Spring Street street art 2006 exhibition in NYC.

== Music projects / Idioblast ==
In 1983, Fekner formed his own band City Squad composed of musicians and non-musicians as an extension of Queensites, a group of teenagers from Jackson Heights who assisted with the outdoor stencil work. In September, Fekner released his first rap/rock 12" EP on his own Vinyl Gridlock record label. The A-side, "2 4 5 7 9 11" had Kwame Monroe, aka Bear 167, a South Bronx graffiti artist as the guest rapper; and the B-side featured Dave Santaniello on rock vocals on "Rock Steady". On the Apple II, Fekner experimented with early speech synthesis programs, Votrax and SAM-Software Automatic Mouth as vocal tracks on "2 4 5 7 9 11" and on his Idioblast (album) in 1984. In addition to playing keyboards, electronic drums and vocals, he wrote the music and lyrics for the eight songs on the album which featured extensive sampling and tape loops of TV, radio, Native American voices, phone and airport transmissions over rock/rap/hip hop beats. Tracks on the album included Travelogue The 80s, I Get Paid To Clap, The Beat, The Sight Of The Child, Wheels Over Indian Trails and Rapicasso, which Fekner also created as a 6' × 12' six-panel painting. Both the painting and song pay homage to Picasso's The Three Dancers. Fekner spray painted LCD-style letters on industrial silkscreens to portray three breakdancers, the song's lyrics acknowledging the work, energy and spirit in breakdancing, rapping and graffiti: "Watch the street, see the modern art, it's the present and future tied to his heart." On Earth Day 1990, Fekner painted over it.

== Reviews ==
New York Times art critic John Russell wrote…Fekner is an artist who works not only in New York but with New York. The city in its more disinherited aspects is the raw material with which he has been working ever since he got a studio space in P.S. 1 in Long Island City in 1976 and learned to regard the huge dilapidated building as "an elderly person who has acutely perceived his experience of life." He went on to work outdoors in Queens and in the Bronx in ways that gave point and urgency to places long sunk in despair. With a word or two (Decay, for instance, or Broken Promises), he brought an element of street theater into disaster areas. With a single stenciled phrase (Wheels Over Indian Trails, for instance) he mingled present with past on the side of the Pulaski Bridge near the Queens-Midtown Tunnel. What in other hands might have been vandalism had a salutary effect. People in desolate parts of the city saw more, felt more, thought more and came out of their apathy.

Lucy Lippard in the Village Voice called him "caption writer to the urban environment, ad-man for the opposition."

The Wooster Collective said, "For us, John Fekner's pioneering stencil work is as important to the history of the urban art movement as the work of artists like Haring, Basquiat. It was artists like Fekner, Leicht, Hambleton and others who truly held down the scene back in the early 1980s."

== Discography ==
JOHN FEKNER CITY SQUAD	Year	Format		VINYL GRIDLOCK RECORDS 33 1/3 RPM
JOHN FEKNER CITY SQUAD	Year	LP	EP	VINYL GRIDLOCK RECORDS 33 1/3 RPM
2 4 5 7 9 11/Rock Steady (ASCAP)	1983		♦	VG#10538/10539
Idioblast (album) 8 songs (ASCAP)	1984	♦		VG#10541-A/10542-B
Another 4 Years	1984			VG#10555 Flexidisc
Cassette Gazette 9 songs (Same as Idioblast plus E Z Gee Jammin)	1985			Audio cassette/Photography book. 62 pages. Produced by Fran Kuzui, Published by B-Sellers, Japan
I Get Paid To Clap (ASCAP)	1985			VG#10569 Flexidisc Released in "Between C & D" Magazine, NYC
Concrete People (ASCAP)	1986		♦	VG#33331/44442
The Beat (89 Remix)	1989			VG#678 Flexidisc
When The Future Collides With History	1989			VG#679 Unreleased-Video soundtrack only.
Oil Drum Mix (ASCAP)	1999			Listed as Final Concerto Oil Drum Mix on David Wojnarowicz-Optic Nerve (CD-ROM). Produced by the Red Hot Organization.
LPEPMP3-Selections (ASCAP)	2008			13 track album release as mp3 available on iTunes Plus.
Another 4 Years (Edit/Elect08)	2008			mp3 available on iTunes

=== Idioblast ===
Idioblast
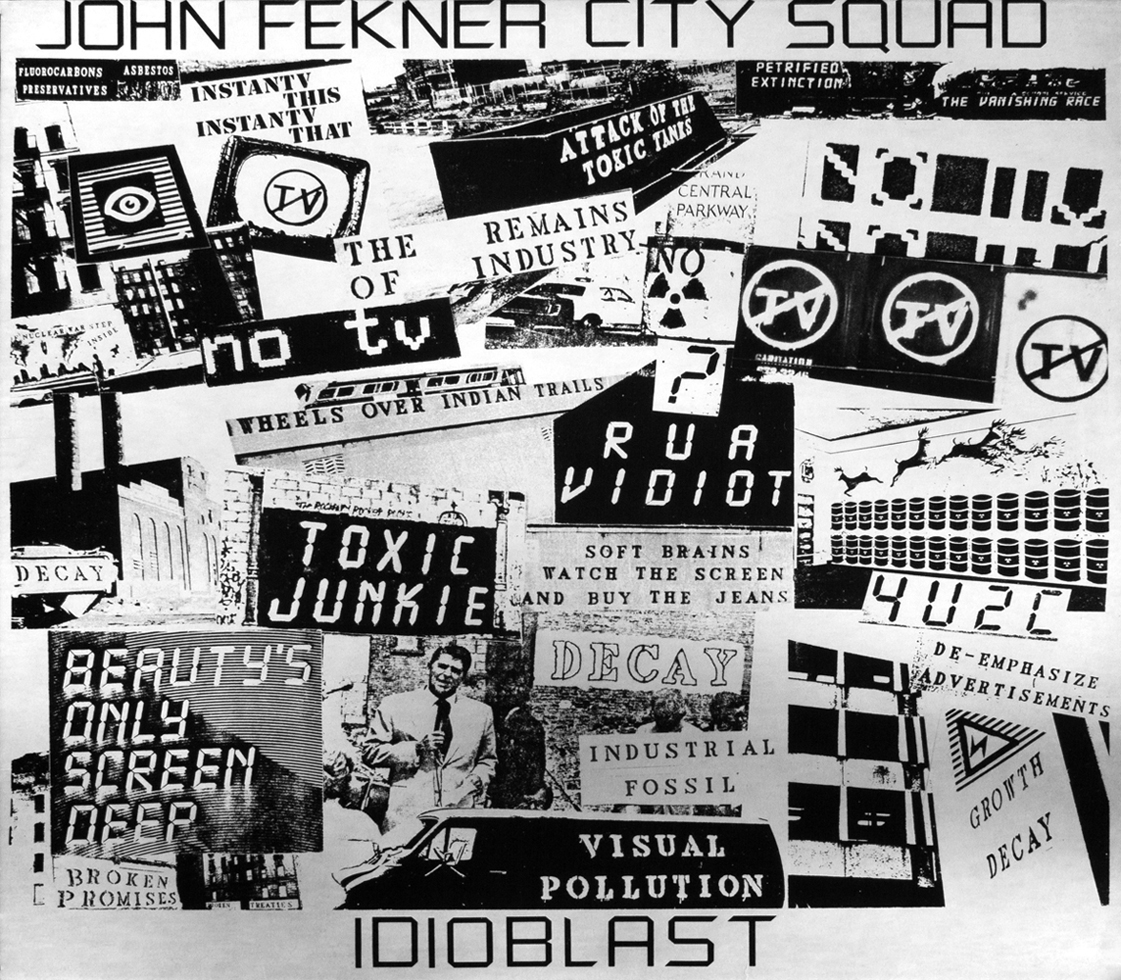

Studio album by John Fekner City Squad
- Released: May 1984
- Recorded: 1983–1984; Monkey Hill Studios, Aura Sonic Mobile Recording, Queens, NY
- Genre: Avant-garde, experimental, industrial, rock, hip hop, rap rock, spoken word, poetry
- Length: 36:34
- Label: Vinyl Gridlock Records
- Producer: John Fekner Dennis Mann Steve Grivas

John Fekner City Squad chronology
2 4 5 7 9 11 - Rock Steady (1983)	''Idioblast'' (1984)	Concrete People (1986)

Idioblast is an album by an American artist John Fekner, recorded and released in 1984 under the name John Fekner City Squad. In addition to playing keyboards, electronic drums and vocals, Fekner wrote and composed the music and lyrics for the eight songs on the album. Idioblast, released on Fekner's own independent record label Vinyl Gridlock Records, is an experimental and eclectic mix of songs featuring extensive sampling and tape loops of TV, radio, Native American voices, phone and airport controller transmissions over rock, rap and hip-hop beats.

==== Background ====
In 1983, the Walker Arts Center and Minneapolis College of Art and Design presented a joint exhibition entitled When Words Become Works. Invited by Diane Shamash, director of MCAD gallery, Fekner agreed to create two new songs specifically for the show to be released as a 12" 33 1/3 rpm EP limited-edition vinyl record under the name of "John Fekner City Squad." The A-side, 2 4 5 7 9 11 featured Kwame Monroe, a.k.a. Bear 167, a South Bronx graffiti artist as the guest rapper. 2 4 5 7 9 11 opens by beautifully incorporating the "I'm-as-mad-as-hell-and-I'm-not-gonna-take-it-anymore" dialogue from the movie Network. Vocals are shared by Fekner, Sandra Seymour and the late Bear 167. It is a high energy rap songs about turning off the television and finding out that "what life is all about is right here on the block."

==== Recording ====
Fekner recording tracks in 1983 and 1984 with his fellow musicians Dennis Mann, Sandra Seymour, Jim Recchione, Paul Sottnick, Robert Morales, Richard Maffei and Steve Grivas, releasing Idioblast in May 1984. Fekner, who was not trained as a musician, would use whatever tools were necessary when composing his music on electronic keyboards and drum machines. He experimented and extensively utilized Votrax and Software Automatic Mouth(SAM), two new text Speech synthesis programs for personal computers. Besides the main vocals and instruments, all the other aural information on the album was recorded on an inexpensive Walkman. “Sophisticated equipment isn't that much of a necessity,” says Fekner.

==== Theme ====
Most of the lyrics on Idioblast focus on concepts that Fekner addresses in his outdoor spray-painted messages seen in New York and other cities in Canada, England, Sweden and Germany. Like the stenciled messages, most of lyrics are slanted ideologically to the left and serve as warnings about corporate media, television, toxic wastes and other social issues. "Virtually every tune on the album is based on the Street Art experience. In a tune called Rapicasso Fekner raps, "Musicians were painting, painters were playing/ Styles were blending like the current trends...Watch the street see the modern art/ It's present and future tied to his heart." Fekner parades a series of found sounds, approximate rap, beat poetry and quick-cut imagery against a steady, pre-fab pulse. But unlike the worst cases of art-rock hybrids where the pretentious intent overwhelms the medium, Idioblast sounds good, beat box or not.

==== Track listing ====
Side one
No.	Title	Writer(s)	Lead vocals/voice	Length
1.	"Halley's Comet/Rapicasso"	J. Fekner	J. Fekner	6:08
2.	"The Beat"	J. Fekner	D. Santaniello	3:32
3.	"Travelogue The 80's"	J. Fekner	Recorded sound/voices loops	9:19

Side two
No.	Title	Writer(s)	Lead vocals/voice	Length
1.	"2 4 5 7 9 11"	J. Fekner	Bear 167, J. Fekner, S. Seymour	6:26
2.	"I Get Paid To Clap"	J. Fekner	J. Fekner, S. Seymour	4:34
3.	"The Sight Of The Child"	J. Fekner James Recchione	A. Lelcht	2:12
4.	"Wheels Over Indian Trails"	J. Fekner D. Santaniello	D. Santaniello	4:23
Total length:				36:34

==== Reviews ====
Upon its release, Idioblast was popular among Club DJ's, college radio stations and independent music pools, receiving good reviews via CMJ and Rockpool music magazines. In her review In Stroll Magazine, Susan Orlean wrote, "Idioblast offers plenty to chew on, both mentally and rhythmically. The rough sound and production do not detract from music that is basically tuneful and engaging, and images that are vivid.”

== Selected bibliography ==
- Stencil Projects 1978–1979, Lund & New York (Edition Sellem, 1979) ISBN 91-85260-14-2
- Queensites (Wedgepress & Cheese, 1982) ISBN 91-85752-320
- Beauty's Only Screen Deep (Wedge Press, Inc.#10, 1983)
- Cassette Gazette (B-Sellers, 1985) ISBN 4-938198-14-2
