= Chisholm Trail (Cambridge) =

Walking and cycling route in Cambridge

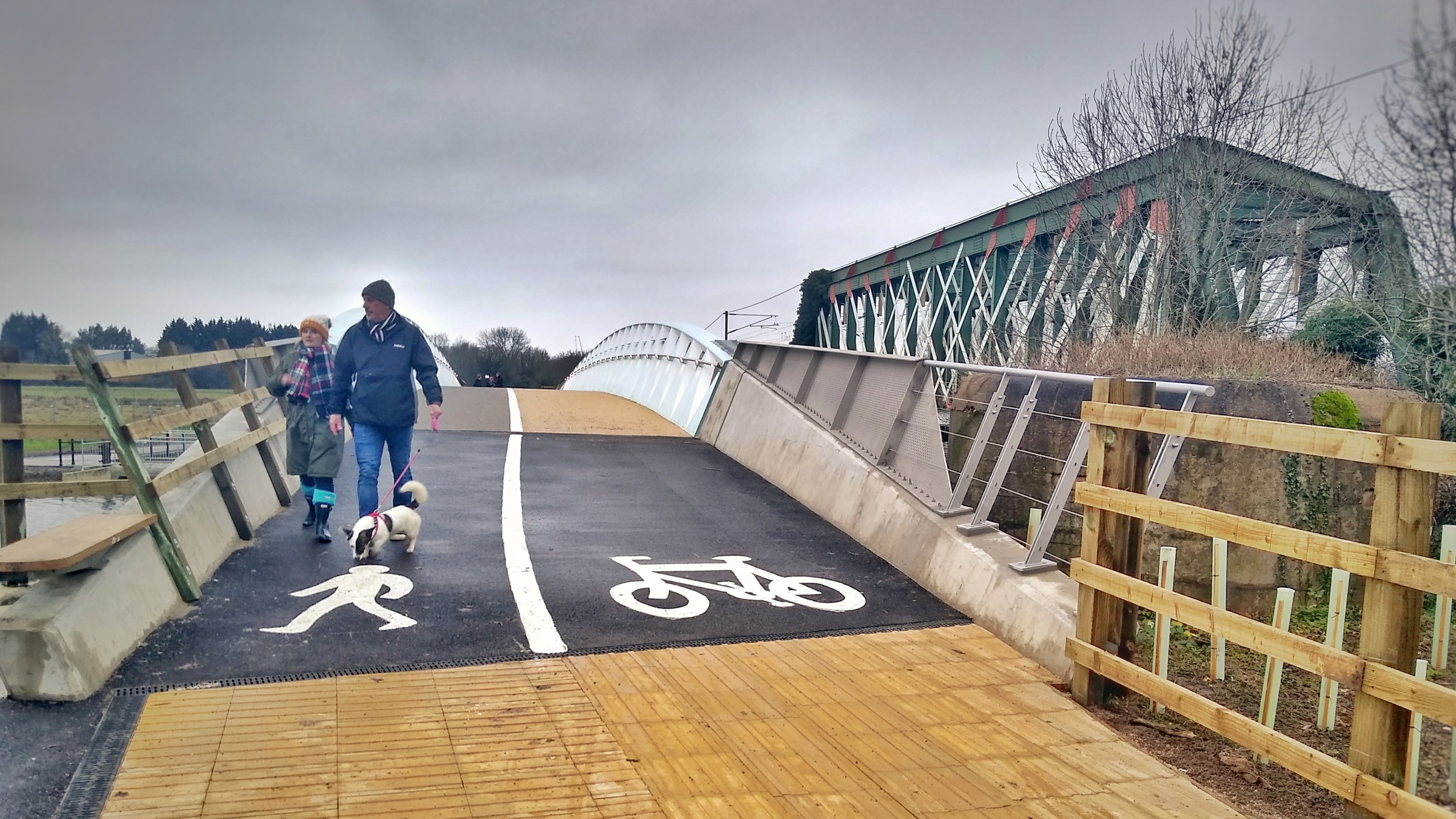
The Abbey–Chesterton pedestrian and cycle bridge in Cambridge, carrying the Chisholm trail over the River Cam, with the railway bridge on the right

The Chisholm Trail is a walking and cycling route in Cambridge, England. It will link Addenbrooke's Hospital and the Biomedical Campus in the south to Cambridge North railway station and the business and science parks. It will also connect with the Guided Busway and the National Cycle Network. Once completed, the trail will provide a 26 kilometre route from Trumpington to St Ives. The route follows current and former rail infrastructure and largely avoids conflicts with car traffic. It includes the new Abbey Chesterton bridge for bicycles and pedestrians across the River Cam, installed in November 2020.

The Chisholm Trail is named after local resident and campaigner Jim Chisholm who first suggested a walking and cycling route along the railway line through central Cambridge. The trail has been promoted by the Cambridge Cycling Campaign since 1998. The route is being implemented through the Greater Cambridge Partnership.

In November 2020 it was reported that the cost of the first phase of the route had risen from £14 million to £21 million.

The first section from Cambridge Science Park to Coldham's Lane including the new bridge over the Cam, opened on 23 December 2021.

== See also ==
- Transport in Cambridge
- Chisholm Trail (disambiguation)
