= DECtalk =

Speech synthesizer and text-to-speech technology

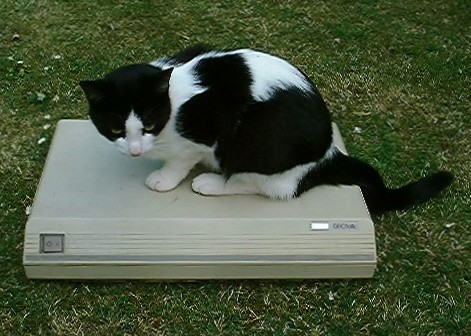
- DECtalk DTC01 (with a cat for scale)
- Developer: Digital Equipment Corporation
- Type: speech synthesizer, text-to-speech
- Released: 1984
- Introductory price: DTC01 US$4,000 (equivalent to $12,396 in 2025)
- Connectivity: RS-232C serial interface
- Platform: OpenVMS, ULTRIX, Digital UNIX, Windows NT
- Dimensions: (DTC01 = W 45.7 cm x D 30.48 cm x H 10.16 cm ( 18in x 12in x 4in) )
- Weight: (DTC01 = 7.2 kg (16 lbs))

DECtalk demo recording using the Perfect Paul and Uppity Ursula voices

DECtalk is a speech synthesizer and text-to-speech technology that was developed by Digital Equipment Corporation in 1983, based largely on the work of Dennis Klatt at the Massachusetts Institute of Technology, whose source-filter algorithm was variously known as KlattTalk or MITalk.

Uses ranged from interacting with the public to allowing those with speech disabilities to verbalize, even giving a public speech.

== History ==
Announced December 1983, a trickle came February 1984; larger DECtalk quantities were delivered in March.

They were standalone units that connected to any device with an asynchronous serial port. These units were also able to connect to the telephone system by having two telephone jacks. One connected to a phone line, the other to a telephone. The DECtalk units could recognize and generate any telephone touch tone. With that capability the units could be used to automate various telephone-related tasks by handling both incoming and outgoing calls. This included acting as an interface to an email system and the capability to function as an alerting system by utilizing the ability to place calls and interact via touch tones with the person answering the phone.

Later units were produced for PCs with ISA bus slots. In addition, various software implementations were produced, most notably the DECtalk Access32. Such implementations began as explorations into real-time software synthesis on general purpose CPUs, subsequently delivering a DECtalk Software product for Digital Unix and for Windows NT on Alpha and Intel processors. Certain versions of the synthesizer were prone to undesirable characteristics. For example, the alveolar stops were often assimilated as sounding more like dental stops. Also, versions such as Access32 would produce faint electronic beeps at the end of phrases.

In the final years, early/mid-2000, the DECtalk IP was sold to Force Computers, Inc. In December 2001, the IP was sold from Force Computers, Inc, to Fonix Speech, Inc. (now SpeechFX, Inc.), which offers DECtalk as a small-footprint TTS system and in a computer program form.

== Features ==
The New York Times wrote: "like a scratchy recording of a person with a lisp" but added "usually understandable."

DECtalk had a number of built-in voices which were identified by the following names: Perfect Paul (the default voice), Beautiful Betty, Huge Harry, Frail Frank, Kit the Kid, Rough Rita, Uppity Ursula, Doctor Dennis and Whispering Wendy. Each of the voices were editable by adjusting various parameters (such as throat size, crossover frequencies, etc.).

Daisy Bell sung by DECtalk

DECtalk understood phonetic spellings of words, allowing customized pronunciation of unusual words. These phonetic spellings could also include a pitch and duration notation which DECtalk would use when enunciating the phonetic components. This allowed DECtalk to sing.

== Uses ==
- The DECtalk engine was notably used in the US National Weather Service's first "Console Replacement System" (CRS) installations in the late 1990s for NOAA Weather Radio. As of 2003 it had all but been replaced by a far more modern engine called Speechify from SpeechWorks (not to be confused with the iOS app of the same name). DECtalk's Perfect Paul preset voiced station identifications on many NWR stations until the CRS was replaced by a new system, called the "Broadcast Message Handler" (BMH), in 2016.
- Huge Harry is predominantly used in ATIS messages for most airports providing such information including prevailing weather conditions.
- One of the early uses was a "text to voice" system that read an individual's emergency medical information (medications, allergies, doctor, insurance and contact info stored in a database) to hospitals telephoning in about patients presenting at emergency rooms. The company, Med-Fax, created by David Grober in 1986, used the DECtalk on an IBM platform, making it one of the early cross platform applications (DEC to IBM).
- DECtalk can be used as part of a speech generating device for those unable to speak. A notable user was Stephen Hawking, who was unable to speak due to a combination of severe disabilities caused by ALS as well as an emergency tracheotomy. Hawking used a version of the DECtalk voice synthesizer for several years and came to be associated with the unique voice of the device. In 2011, Hawking's research assistant Sam Blackburn said Hawking still used a version of DECtalk identified on its board as the "Calltext 5010" manufactured in 1988 by SpeechPlus, Inc., because he identified with it and had not heard a voice he liked better. The CallText 5010 was still listed on Hawking's site as of 2015. A team from Cambridge (UK) and Palo Alto eventually emulated the workings of the CallText 5010 on a Raspberry Pi, which Hawking used from January 2018 to his death in March of that year.

=== In popular culture ===
- The character "Dee Klatt" from Chipspeech was based on data from this device.
- In the sixth episode of Tales from the Darkside, Mookie and Pookie, the voice of Kevin "Mookie" Anderson is created with a DECtalk.
- The video game Moonbase Alpha uses a software version of DECtalk for chat text. Several viral videos were created showcasing users using the chat in a nonsensical manner and using its ability to sing songs.
- The experimental rock band The Space Negros uses DECtalk in their 1986 song "Robot."
- DECtalk was used in the song "Musique Non-Stop" by the band Kraftwerk. (Released 1986) It was edited and recorded by Florian Schneider and Karl Bartos at Kling Klang Studio Düsseldorf.
- DECtalk's built in "Perfect Paul" voice has been ported to the freeware singing voice synthesizer UTAU by the user UtaUtaUtau.
