= Alter/Ego =

Real-time voice synthesizer software

- Screenshot of the word creation tab with Daisy loaded
- Developer: Plogue Art et Technologie, Inc.
- Initial release: 9 September 2015; 10 years ago
- Stable release: 1.578 / 9 May 2024; 19 months ago
- Operating system: Windows XP or higher, OS X 10.6.8 or higher
- Available in: English, Japanese, French
- Type: Voice synthesizer
- Website: www.plogue.com/products/alter-ego.html

Alter/Ego (アルター・エゴ) is a free real-time vocal synthesizer software which was created by Plogue.

== About ==
Alter/Ego is a text-to-speech synthesizer which aims to create more modern vocals, working to post 1990s research. It was offered as a free plug-in and is used for music making to produce singing vocals. It operates in a similar manner to Chipspeech. Vocals are clean-cut though robotic sounding and the software is ideal for vocal experimentation. It is capable of running different speech engines.

There are currently only 2 released vocals for the software. The released vocals are purchased separately. The vocals come as files that need to be extracted as they lack installers. Over time Plogue have received many vocal requests from individuals since the release of the software, however they are limited by their small development team and being busy.

In January 2016 it was announced that there were 6 new vocals in production. No more vocals are due after Leora and Marie Orks final two vocal updates. Plogue have since moved on to other adaptations of the engine. One such adaptation is the ability for the engine to detect Microsoft text-to-speech voices and load them into the engine. UTAU has also been experimented with. Plogue noted that the engine was designed to have user made vocal support from the beginning, though this was yet to be implemented due to a lack of support for this.

In 2017 the production of new voicebanks ceased with Marie Ork "Clear" and Leora, having been confirmed as the last voicebanks being produced for the software. The cease of new voicebanks came in the wake of a scandal with the creator of voicebanks "Vera" and "Nata". Although the engine has been updated since 2017, these updates relate mainly to its Chipspeech technology. Alter/Ego has not received new voicebanks or major features since then, as the overall development of Alter/Ego has ceased.

== Characters ==
- Daisy: Daisy was the very first vocal added to the software. Daisy is a lonely time traveller and the estranged lover of Chipspeech vocal, Dandy 704. Daisy was offered as a free separate download, allowing her to be imported into both Alter/Ego and Chipspeech and acted as the default vocal. She was retired and replaced with Bones.
- Tera Eleki (エレキテラ); was revealed on Sept 7th 2015 and was a Japanese only vocal. She has since been cancelled.
- ALYS: A female vocal released on 10 March 2016. She sings in French and Japanese, and has a Live Polyphonic CAhoir mode. She was developed by VoxWave. On 15 December 2021, the news that VoxWave had closed, and that ALYS for AlterEgo was now free, and ALYS' previously unreleased UTAU prototypes were now free and open source, was released on Phundrak, ALYS' creator's blog.
- Bones: A male vocal that sings/talks in English and sings in Japanese, first unveiled in Jan 2016, first released in 31 Oct 2016. He replaced Daisy as the default vocal for the software. He has a Chinese vocal being currently worked on.
- Marie Ork: a Death Metal female vocalist, she was released on 1 December 2016 and sings in English. She was released with two vocals "Growl" and "Space". A "Talk" and "Clean" vocal were later added.
- LEORA: The second French female vocal developed by VoxWave. She was created complementary to ALYS, with English and French voicebanks.
- NATA: An English vocal developed by Vocallective. She is an adult female and was released on 11 January 2017. Though she started out as official, Plogue has since dropped their support of her.
- VERA: Was a female English prototype developed by Azureflux from Vocallective without the Plogue's authorization, the project was available on this page, but is now cancelled.

== Reception ==
As noted by BPB, Alter/Ego is praised for being a powerful tool by standards of free software. It, however, has a steep learning curve, though highlighted how easy it was to get the synthesizer to sing lyrics, calling the product "fun" to work with overall. Later in December that year, the software was awarded second place in their top 50 free instruments list.

Computer Music magazine also covered the synthesizer in their December 2015 issue.
