= Munch Man =

1982 video game

- Developer: Texas Instruments
- Publisher: Texas Instruments
- Designer: Jim Dramis
- Platform: TI-99/4A
- Release: 1982
- Genres: Maze

Munch Man (inconsistently written in the manual as Munchman) is a video game written by Jim Dramis for the TI-99/4A home computer and published as a cartridge by Texas Instruments in 1982. Based on Namco's Pac-Man, it includes several variations that alter gameplay. Instead of emptying the maze of dots, Munch Man leaves a chain-like pattern as it moves, and the goal is to fill the entire maze. Dramis later wrote Parsec for the TI-99/4A.

== Plot ==
From the front of the manual:

Four cunning Hoonos are in hot pursuit of your Munchman while he races to an energizer to change the attack. Can he make it to safety, or does his fate lie in the mouth of the Hoonos?

== Gameplay ==
The player controls Munch Man using either the keyboard or joystick. Like Pac-Man, the goal of a level is to visit every part of the maze, but instead of eating dots the player fills the maze with a chain pattern. Four Hoonos (the equivalent of Pac-Man ghosts) attempt to thwart Munch Man's efforts to complete his mission. However, Munch Man always has his "Energizer" (the equivalent of a Pac-Man power pill) which gives Munch Man the ability to devour the Hoonos. The game ends when the player's lives are depleted.

The shape of the Hoonos changes with each level, but their colors remain consistent. Each level has Hoonos colored red, yellow, blue, and purple. There are 20 unique sets of Hoonos. Beginning with level 21, the Hoonos recycle shape.

In level 20, 40, and 60, the maze is invisible and there are no chains. Instead, Munch Man must eat all the TI logos in the invisible maze. This gives the odd effect of showcasing the maze at first, but slowly hiding the maze as the player removes the indications of the maze paths by eating the TI logos.

=== Scoring ===
10 points are earned for every link of the chain made.

70 points are awarded for each of the four Texas-shaped energizers eaten per level.

100 points are given for the first Hoono munched, 200 for the second, 400 for the third, and 800 for the fourth.

For every 10,000 points earned, an extra Munch Man is awarded.

== Development ==
Originally, Munch Man gobbled dots and power-pills, just like Pac-Man. However, TI decided to avoid the risk of a lawsuit to replace the dots with laying down a chain and power pellets were changed out for TI logos.

== Legacy ==
In 1987, Triton Products published Munchman II as a sequel for the TI-99/4A. It uses artwork from the original release in the manual, but is not a licensed game. Munchman II was written by former TI employee John Phillips who worked on games for the 99/4A such as Hopper and Moon Mine.
