= Don Leicht =

American painter

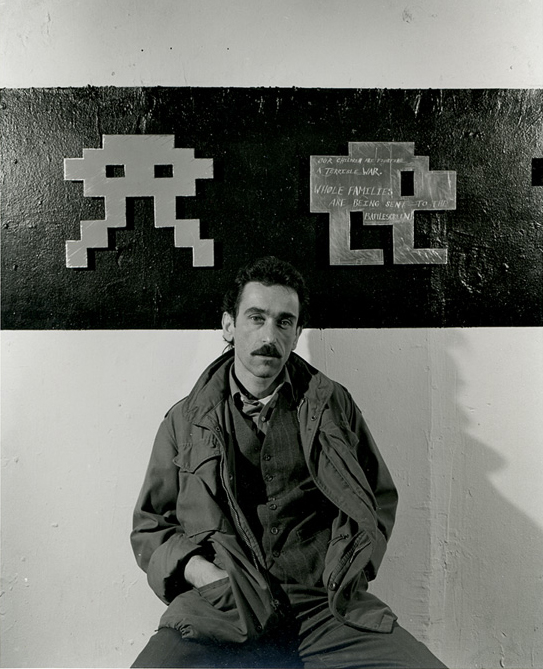
- Leicht in 1982
- Born: Don Leicht; October 12, 1946; New York City, United States
- Died: January 22, 2021 (aged 74)
- Education: School of Visual Arts Lehman College
- Known for: Art, painting, sculpture, writing

Don Leicht (October 12, 1946 – January 22, 2021) was a visual artist who worked as a painter and sculptor in the Bronx, New York City for over forty years. Leicht had one person exhibitions in New York, Sweden and Germany and was an early figure in the New York City downtown scene in the 1970s, and in the subsequent Street Art and Graffiti movements.

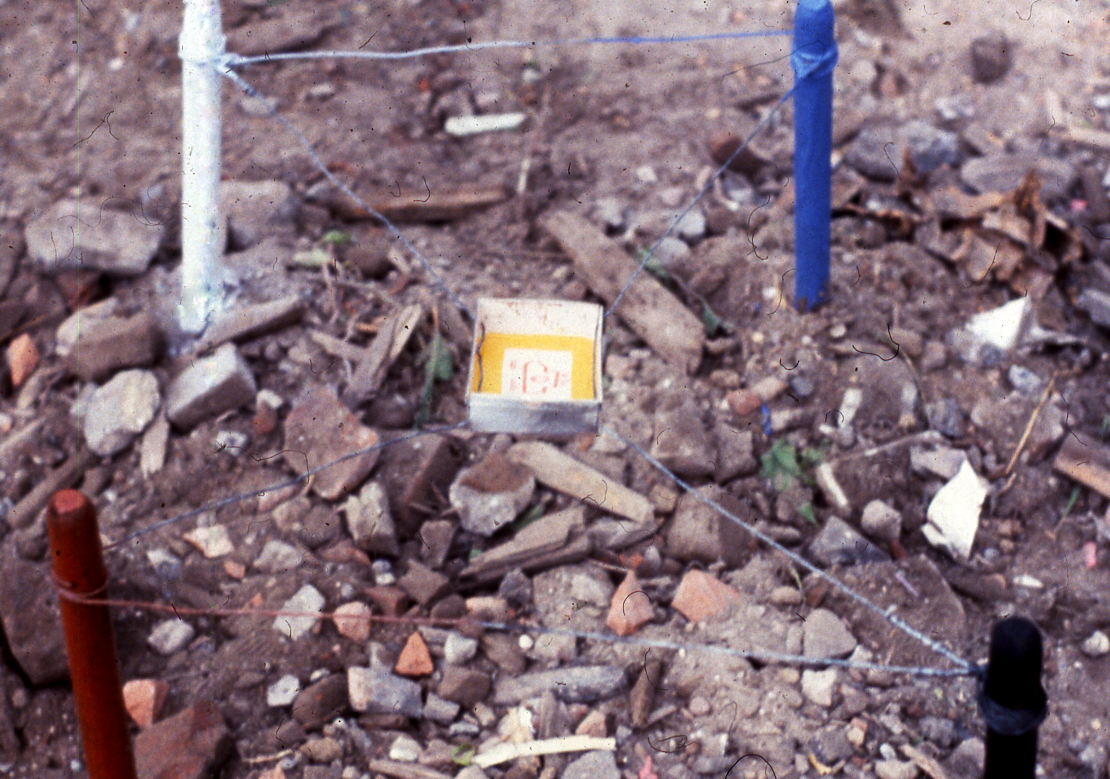
Don Leicht, Bird Feeders, Charlotte Street, South Bronx, NY, 1980

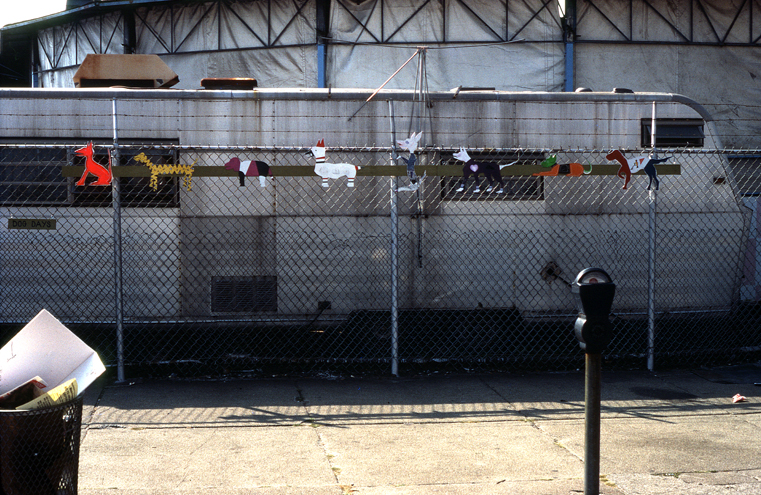
Don Leicht, Dog Days, aluminum paint on metal mounted on wood, 1981

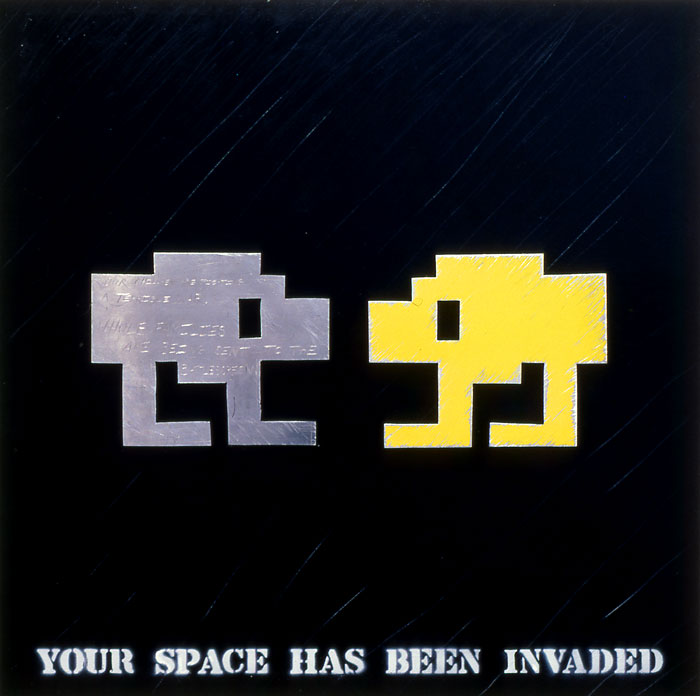
John Fekner and Don Leicht, Your Space Has Been Invaded. Our Children are Fighting a Terrible War. Whole Families are being led to the Battlescreen. Spray paint and automotive paint on cut aluminum relief metal, 4' x 4', 1982

== Fashion Moda ==
Fashion Moda is most often associated with graffiti art and its acceptance into the art world through such figures as John Fekner, Jean-Michel Basquiat, Jenny Holzer, and Keith Haring. In 1981, Leicht participated in Fashion Moda's annual South Bronx exhibition, and the following year in From The Monkey To The Monitor an installation by Fekner, Leicht and Fred Baca which included a live performance by Phoebe Legere.

== Charlotte Street ==
In August 1980, John Fekner and Don Leicht worked together on an outdoor project located at the site of the People's Convention held at Charlotte Street in the South Bronx. Held on August 8–10, the People's Convention was an alternative and direct response to the National Convention of the Democratic Party being held at Madison Square Garden in New York City. Fekner's stenciled messages included Decay, Broken Promises, Falsas Promesas, Last Hope, Broken Treaties and Save Our School were succinct and dramatic in size; Leicht's Birdfeeders were small-scaled and intimate painted sculptures for the children of the neighborhood. Their work transversely complemented each other with two different and distinct approaches that identified and drew attention to the existing conditions of the immediate Black and Latino communities, as well the concerns of Native American Indians. Presidential candidate Ronald Reagan stood amidst the abandoned buildings on August 5, 1980 promising to rebuild the area, as did his predecessor President Jimmy Carter in October 1977. The area has seen improvements through the rebuilding initiatives of Mayor Ed Koch, Ed Logue's SBDO Charlotte Street Gardens, and the ongoing efforts of MBD Community Housing Corporation, SoBro and other newer partnerships and financial institutions.

== Collaborations ==
Leicht began collaborating with Queens artist John Fekner at P.S. 1 where they shared a studio in 1976. In 1982, they began a series of work and installations using steel, cut metal, aluminum and automotive paints based on Nishikado's Space Invaders arcade game with the statement: Your Space Has Been Invaded-Our Children are Fighting a Terrible War. Whole families are being sent to Battlescreen. Their Beauty's Only Street Deep was installed at the Wooster Collective's 11 Spring Street street art 2006 exhibition in NYC. In 1978, Leicht painted outdoors in Fekner's Detective Show in Gorman Park in Queens which included the words street museum on the invitation card.

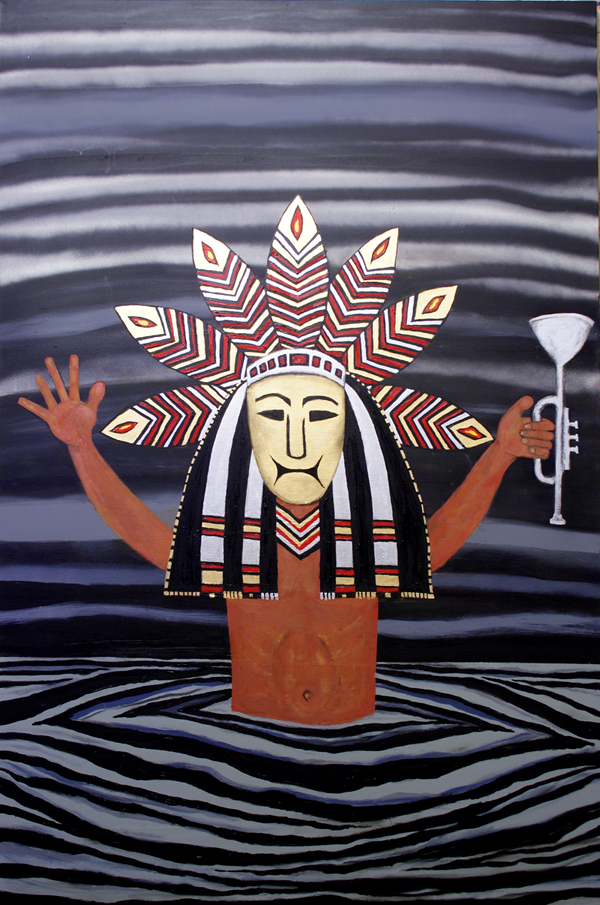
Don Leicht, Fat Tuesday, acrylic on canvas, 2004

== Reviews ==
O’Brien, Glenn, Artforum magazine, 1983

Review of From the Monkey to the Monitor, Fashion Moda, South, Bronx

The Wooster Collective said, "For us, John Fekner's pioneering stencil work is as important to the history of the urban art movement as the work of artists like Haring, Basquiat. It was artists like Fekner, Leicht, Hambleton and others who truly held down the scene back in the early 80's."

In 1983, art writer Glenn O'Brien in a review in Artforum magazine states, "Leicht's piece consists of a sequence of creatures that exist only on a video screen- Pac Man, Donkey Kong, and other Atari-type stable mates. Leicht has cut the forms of these leisure demons from heavy aluminum plate and enameled them with their normal, unnatural colors. But each creature has also been abraded, scratches in the enamel showing the metal underneath. One geometric thing – an abstracted dog? an "Imperial Walker"? – has been scratched with a message like a toilet-stall graffito or the "Pray" scratched on the metal of New York City phone booths.

== Selected bibliography ==
- Fekner, John (1979). Stencil Projects 1978–1979, Lund & New York. Lund, Sweden: Edition Sellem. ISBN 91-85260-14-2.
- Fekner, John (1983). Beauty's Only Screen Deep. NY, NY: Wedge Press, Inc. #10.
- Fekner, John (1985). Cassette Gazette. Tokyo, Japan: B-Sellers. ISBN 4-938198-14-2.
- Gumpert, Lynn, curator, New Work New York at the New Museum, Exhibition catalog essay, January 30 – March 25, 1982. p. 12–15
- Howze, Russell, Stencil Nation: Graffiti, Community, and Art, Manic D Press, San Francisco, CA, 2008, ISBN 978-1-933149-22-6
- Kahane, Lisa, Do Not Give Way to Evil, Photographs of the South Bronx, 1979–1987, powerHouse books, a Miss Rosen edition, Brooklyn, NY, 2008, ISBN 978-1-57687-432-5
- Lippard, Lucy, Get The Message-A Decade of Social Change, Penguin Group (USA) Incorporated, 1985 ISBN 0525242562

== Gallery ==
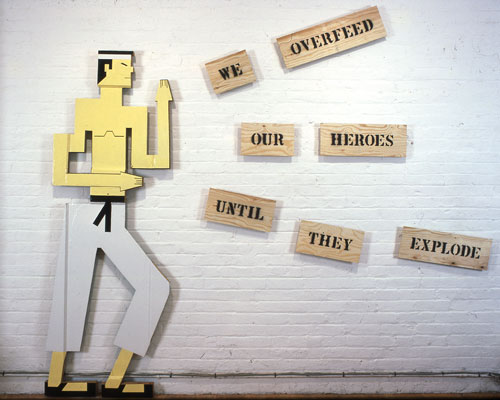
John Fekner & Don Leicht

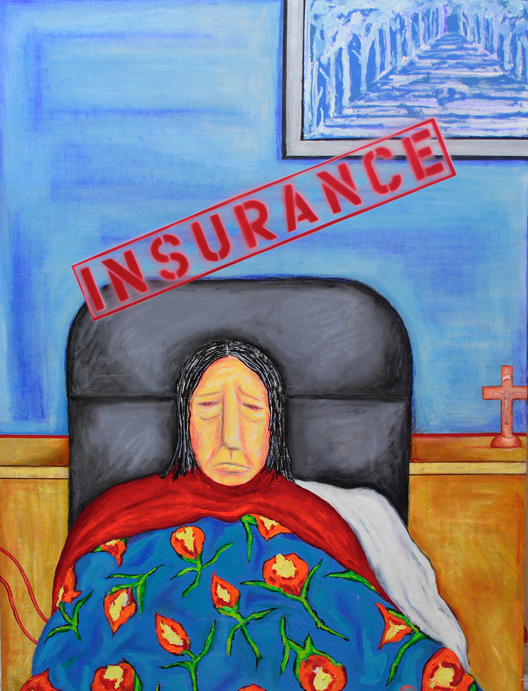
John Fekner and Don Leicht

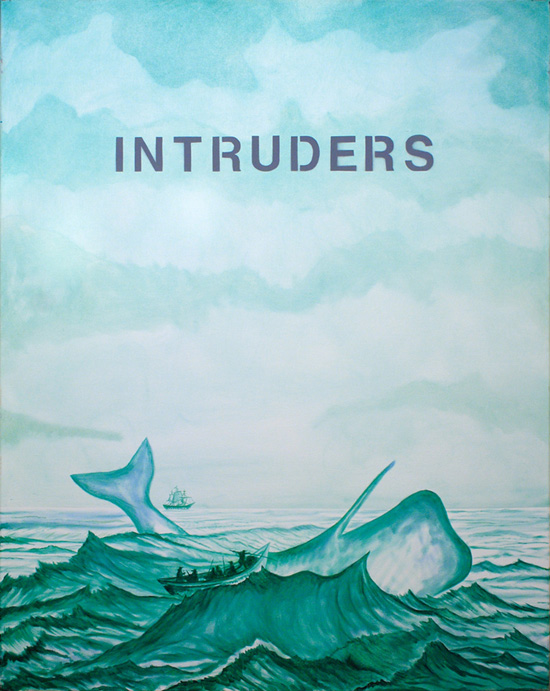
John Fekner & Don Leicht
