= Zero Zap =

1979 video game

- Developer: Milton Bradley Company
- Programmer: Herb Schmitz
- Platform: TI-99/4A
- Release: 1979

Zero Zap is a video game programmed by Herb Schmitz for the TI-99/4 and TI-99/4A home computers and published by Milton Bradley Company in 1979.

Zero Zap part of the Milton Bradley Gamevision series: Connect Four, Yahtzee, Hangman, Zero Zap, Card Sharp, and Stratego. These six cartridges were the launch titles for the TI-99/4 in 1979. Milton Bradley was the first third party to release games for the TI-99 home computer. The company was only planning on producing these cartridges for a year before passing production over to Texas Instruments.

== Reception ==
Zero Zap is included in the 1984 book, The Best Texas Instruments Software: "Zero Zap is colorful, fast-paced, and has excellent sound."

In a retrospective look at the game, Issue 1 of Classic Gamer Magazine wrote, "Moving on, we came across another lame Video-Pinball game. Zero Zap was for the TI-99/4A home computer.... Real pinball games, even the video-pinballs of the world are games of skill. Zero Zap is pure luck and utter garbage."
