= Dennis H. Klatt =

American researcher in speech and hearing science

- Born: March 31, 1938; Milwaukee, Wisconsin, U.S.
- Died: December 30, 1988 (aged 50); Cambridge, Massachusetts, U.S.
- Occupation: Researcher

DECtalk demo

White House Millennium Lecture Series - -2 - Stephen Hawking

Dennis H. Klatt (March 31, 1938 – December 30, 1988) was an American researcher in speech and hearing science. Klatt was the pioneer of computerized speech synthesis and created an interface which allowed for speech for non-expert users for the first time. His research was commercialized as DECtalk. The default male voice in DECTalk, Perfect Paul, is based on Klatt's own voice.

Prior to his work, non-verbal individuals would need specialist support to be able to speak at all. Stephen Hawking used an equivalent voice to Perfect Paul, which Hawking chose to keep even after more advanced speech synthesizers became available.

== Biography ==
Dennis Klatt was born in Milwaukee, Wisconsin, on March 31, 1938. He received the B.S. and M.S. degrees in electrical engineering from Purdue University, West Lafayette, Indiana, in 1960 and 1961, respectively, and the Ph.D. degree in communication sciences from the University of Michigan, Ann Arbor, in 1964. He joined the Massachusetts Institute of Technology as an assistant professor in 1965, becoming a senior research scientist in 1978, and remained a member of the MIT faculty until his death.

An author of more than 60 scientific papers, Klatt was awarded the Silver Medal in Speech Communication by the Acoustical Society of America for "fundamental and applied contributions to the synthesis and recognition of speech", and the John Price Wetherill Medal by the Franklin Institute "for the design of a machine that can articulate written language", both in 1987.

Klatt developed a complete system for synthesis of speech from English text, and his research led to a detailed specification of rules for segmental durations in English. Throughout his career Klatt retained a keen interest in seeing the results of his work applied to the special needs of blind and other handicapped persons, such as his work on Stephen Hawking's voice synthesizer. He died in Cambridge, Massachusetts, on December 30, 1988, after a long struggle with cancer which also took his voice.
