= The Attack (video game) =

1981 video game

- Manual
- Developer: Milton Bradley
- Publisher: Texas Instruments
- Programmer: Jim Pettingell
- Platform: TI-99/4A
- Release: 1981
- Genre: Multidirectional shooter

The Attack is a multidirectional shooter video game created, designed, and implemented by Jim Pettingell for the TI-99/4A home computer and published by Texas Instruments in 1981. The game was developed at Milton Bradley as Alien Attack, inspired by the movies Alien (1979) and Barbarella (1968). After being sold to TI, the name was changed to The Attack.

== Gameplay ==
The player flies a spaceship in four directions around a single screen, shooting "spores", which connect together to form new aliens, and already formed aliens before they eat the player. Incubators, shown as square boxes, release more spores or, in later levels, aliens.

There are four skill levels: Novice, Intermediate, Master, and Pro.

== See also ==
- Alien (Atari 2600)
