= SpeechFX =

SpeechFX, Inc.
- Formerly: Fonix Corporation
- Type: Private
- Founded: 1994; 32 years ago
- Headquarters: Lindon, Utah, US
- Key people: Roger D. Dudley (CEO)
- Products: Speech synthesis; Speech recognition

SpeechFX, Inc. (formerly Fonix Corporation) offers voice technology for mobile phone and wireless devices, interactive video games, toys, home appliances, computer telephony systems and vehicle telematics. SpeechFX speech solutions are based on the firm’s proprietary neural network-based automatic speech recognition (ASR) and Fonix DECtalk, a text-to-speech speech synthesis system (TTS). Fonix speech technology is user-independent, meaning no voice training is involved.

== Product applications ==
SpeechFX works with application developers and equipment manufacturers to speech enable devices and systems, to create voice-based user interfaces. SpeechFX technology supports multiple operating systems and hardware platforms. SpeechFX technology is available in more than 12 TTS languages and more than 10 speaker-independent ASR languages.

== Product implementation ==
SpeechFX speech recognition technologies are currently available for many major products and systems, including Microsoft Xbox and Xbox 360, Sony PlayStation 2, PlayStation 3, PC, Seiko Epson semiconductor chips, Pocket PC and smartphone devices, and others. Casio and other Asian manufacturers currently offer several handheld electronic dictionaries featuring SpeechFX text-to-speech. Many mid-sized businesses use SpeechFX’s telephony product as a 24-hour speech recognition telephone attendant.

== Company information ==
Founded in 1994, SpeechFX, Inc. is headquartered in Lindon, Utah. Before 2011, the company was named Fonix Corporation.
