= Plogue Art et Technologie, Inc. =

Canadian software company

- Company type: Inc
- Industry: Music Software
- Founded: 2000
- Headquarters: Montreal, Quebec, Canada
- Area served: World
- Key people: David Viens (CEO)
- Products: ARIA Engine, Bidule, chipsounds, chipcrusher, chipspeech, Alter/Ego, sforzando, chipsynth suite
- Website: www.plogue.com

Plogue Art et Technologie, Inc. is an incorporated company based in Montreal, Quebec, Canada that develops music software including Bidule, chipsounds, Alter/Ego and chipspeech.

The name "Plogue" was chosen as it means "plug" in Quebec Anglicism/slang.

The company also has interesting old chips and many of its software releases focus on recreating the older synthesizer chips from the pre-90s. Much of David Viens' work within the company involves ROM dumping, he collects old voice synthesizers and their ROMs. Hubert Lamontagne was hired by the company due to his knowledge of phonetics and this led to the creation of Chipspeech and Alter/Ego.

On November 25, 2024, Plogue officially announced the discontinuation of its Twitter account, which was first established in May 2009.
