= Alpiner =

1982 video game

- Manual
- Developer: Texas Instruments
- Publisher: Texas Instruments
- Designer: Janet Srimushnam
- Platform: TI-99/4A
- Release: 1982
- Genre: Action

Alpiner is an action video game designed by Janet Srimushnam for the TI-99/4A home computer and published on cartridge by Texas Instruments in 1982. The player climbs six of the world's highest mountains while avoiding trees, animals, falling rocks, and landslides. The mountains in the game are Mount Hood, the Matterhorn, Mount Kenya, Mount McKinley, Mount Garmo, and Mount Everest. The Alpiner cartridge originally retailed for $39.95 (USD).

== Gameplay ==
After selecting 1-2 players and moving past the main screen with the mountains and elevations the game begins. The player must climb the side of each mountain and make it to the summit in the allotted time.

Obstacles placed in the alpiner's way include falling rocks, wild animals, trees, and brush fires that they must avoid to continue up the mountain. In level 7 the avalanche obstacle is introduced, and in level 13, ice falls. Being hit by obstacles will result in sliding a variable distance down the mountain. If the alpiner slides all the way down the mountain, one of the lives are lost. Players receive an additional life every time they make it to the top of Mount Everest.

There are 18 levels in the game divided into 3 rounds. The player must climb each of the six mountains successfully to continue on to the next round.

== Sound ==
The game can be played with or without the commentary or voices, but to play with them requires the use of the TI Solid State Speech Synthesizer. The voices and commentary help to warn of approaching obstacles and comment on your progress.

The music heard during gameplay is Anitra's Dance from Act IV of Peer Gynt by Norwegian composer Edvard Grieg.

Anitra's Dance

The music heard after reaching the top of Mount Everest is a fragment of the Suite No. 2, in D Major II - Alla Hornpipe; from Water Music, by German composer Georg Friedrich Händel.

== Cheat ==
Pressing the keys "*#*" (in that exact sequence) on the game's title screen allows players to set their starting number of lives in the game, from 1 to 9 lives, and the level of difficulty, from 1 to 18. Enabling this cheat displays the word "Test" on the bottom left of the screen.
