= Software Automatic Mouth =

1982 speech synthesis program

- Atari cover for Software Automatic Mouth
- Original author: Mark Barton
- Developer: Don’t Ask Software
- Release: 1982; 44 years ago
- Platform: Apple II, Lisa, Atari 8-bit, Commodore 64.
- Type: Speech synthesis

A demo of SAM on the C64

Software Automatic Mouth, or S.A.M. (sometimes abbreviated as SAM), is a speech synthesis program developed by Mark Barton and sold by Don't Ask Software. The program was released for the Atari 8-bit computers, Apple II, and Commodore 64. First appearing in the October 1982 issue of Antic magazine, it was one of the first commercial all-software voice-synthesis programs. S.A.M.'s main selling points were its software-only design, which required no additional hardware, and a relatively low cost of $59.95 for the Atari version.

Don't Ask Software also sold PokerSAM, a poker game with speech.

== Technology ==
The Apple version uses an included expansion card which contains an 8-bit DAC. The Atari version makes use of the embedded POKEY audio chip. The audible output is extremely distorted speech when graphic and text display is turned on. The Commodore 64 makes use of the 64's embedded SID audio chip's 4-bit volume DAC. When producing speech, the Commodore 64 version blanks the screen as the program accesses memory, although a "light" mode can be activated that leaves the screen active, producing a "gravelly" voice. Active sprites also cause a deterioration in the quality of voice output.

=== Phonetic Mode ===
SAM accepts input in an ASCII-based phonetic notation, derived from the International Phonetic Alphabet, comprising roughly 50 phonemes. Each phoneme is written as a one– or two-letter code paired with a sample sound—for example, IY (as in "feet"), AE ("Sam"), or NX ("song"). The set is organized into vowels, diphthongs, and voiced and unvoiced consonants, alongside special symbols such as Q for a glottal stop and DX for a flap. Stress is indicated by appending a digit from 1–8 to a vowel. A full word written in Phonetic Mode would look like this: WIHKIHPIY4DIYAX

Phonetic mode addresses some of the limitations of SAM's rule-based text-to-speech (RECITER) system, which mispronounces irregularly spelled English words and cannot reliably place stress; entering phonemes directly gives the user more precise control over both.

== Legacy ==
S.A.M. was used as the basis for the original MacInTalk speech synthesis software.
