= Texas Instruments Professional Portable Computer =

Portable version of the Texas Instruments Professional Computer

The Texas Instruments Portable Professional Computer (TIPPC) is a portable version of the Texas Instruments Professional Computer (TIPC), both of which were released on January 31, 1983. The TIPC is a desktop PC and the TIPPC is a fully compatible, portable version of the TIPC, and both machines were DOS-compatible, but not IBM PC compatible. Both computers were most often used by white-collar information workers and professionals who needed to gather, manipulate and transmit information.

== Specifications ==
While not IBM PC compatible, the TI Professional Computer runs MS-DOS as the operating system.

The standard version of the TIPPC has a built-in 9" monochrome monitor; the upgraded version has a 9" color monitor. It has a maximum resolution of 720 × 300 pixels. The standard device is equipped with 64 KB RAM and can be expanded to 768 KB.

The TI Portable Professional Computer was one of the first portable computers available with a built-in color screen (optional), and one of the first portable computers that could be connected to an Ethernet network, with the addition of one of 3Com's first Ethernet cards.

Additionally, both the TIPC and TIPPC were equipped with voice recognition software, allowing the user to speak basic commands to the computers. Both computers also featured an Ethernet card, a new device developed in 1983 by 3Com.
