= Texas Instruments Professional Computer =

Personal computer produced by Texas Instruments

The Texas Instruments Professional Computer (abbreviated TIPC or TI PC) is a personal computer produced by Texas Instruments (TI) that was released on January 31, 1983, and discontinued around 1985; the TIPC is a desktop PC and the Texas Instruments Professional Portable Computer (TIPPC) is a portable version that is fully compatible with it. Both computers were most often used by white-collar information workers and professionals that needed to gather, manipulate and transmit information.

== Features and specifications ==
The TIPC is very similar to the IBM PC both architecturally and from a user-experience perspective, with some technically superior aspects. It is based on the Intel 8088 CPU and an optional Intel 8087 floating point coprocessor. It supports MS-DOS-compatible operating systems, but is not a fully IBM PC compatible computer. Alternative operating systems are CP/M-86, Concurrent CP/M-86, and the UCSD p-System.

The CPU clocks at 5 MHz (a bit faster than the 4.77 MHz of the IBM PC) and has 64 KB of RAM pre-installed. A RAM board can be installed in an expansion slot providing an additional 192 KB or RAM, for a maximum of 256 KB. A later version supports up to 768 KB of total memory. The computer featured 5 expansion slots and has either a 12-inch green-phosphor monochrome (CRT) monitor or a 12-inch color monitor with a color graphics resolution of 720 × 300 pixels. For text, the display shows 25 lines of 80 columns each. The device has a 5¼-inch floppy disk drive and can support a second floppy drive or a "Winchester" hard drive without requiring the use of an expansion slot or separate chassis, and typically features one of each.

The keyboard has a different layout for the arrow keys and is quieter than the IBM PC. The keyboard has 57 typewriter keys, 5 cursor control keys, 12 function keys and a separate 18-key numeric keypad area. The keyboard has "infinite height adjustment from 5 to 15 degrees slope and connects to the system unit with a telephone-type coiled cord so you can position the keyboard for greatest comfort (even use it in your lap)". The computer also has the capability to map the keyboard keys to characters to support arbitrary user customization of the keyboard layout. The keyboard ordinarily supports 256 distinct characters to enable international use, and the character set can be expanded to 512 characters for special-purpose applications. A light is provided to indicate uppercase mode selection.

Speech synthesis and speech recognition were added after the initial release, including support of natural-language queries with a relational database.

== Reception ==
The Rosen Electronics Letter in February 1983 said that the Professional "comes with a full array of features and a price that should help it win in competition with the IBM PC". Noting TI's decision to follow the PC's MS-DOS and Intel 8088 standards, the newsletter approved of the "impressive array of more than 100 packages" available immediately, as well as a Z80 SoftCard and TI's proprietary speech technology. Rosen predicted that the Professional "should be one of the year's biggest successes ... although we'd rather it had been completely compatible with the PC", adding that "we know of one case (and there will be many)" where a customer chose the PC because of "the name, the trustworthiness and most important of all the identity of IBM".

Personal Computer World in May 1983 was surprised that TI did not use its own CPU in Professional. The magazine approved of the hardware design and documentation, and found that the natural-language interface worked well if slowly. PCW questioned Professional's ability, however, to challenge the PC's dominance: "I liked the machine as long as I thought about it as a new business machine from TI — I got a little worried about it when I thought of it as an IBM PC work-alike".

Byte in December 1983 praised its "well, wonderful" keyboard and quality design, and said that the display "is one of its most outstanding features". The magazine reported that BASIC 1.1 was buggy and had poor documentation, but that 1.2 had fixed the bugs and a much improved manual. Byte concluded that for non-novice buyers willing to purchase most peripherals from TI, the Professional was "a machine that is superior in many ways. It invites a closer look".

InfoWorld in November 1984 said that the Professional desktop and portable had not been very successful, despite good reviews.

== Software ==
There are 11 commercial games, all from Infocom:

Name	Publisher
Deadline	Infocom
Enchanter	Infocom
Infidel	Infocom
Planetfall	Infocom
Sorcerer	Infocom
Starcross	Infocom
Suspend	Infocom
The Witness	Infocom
Zork I	Infocom
Zork II	Infocom
Zork III	Infocom
