= TI-99/4A =

Home computer by Texas Instruments

TI-99/4

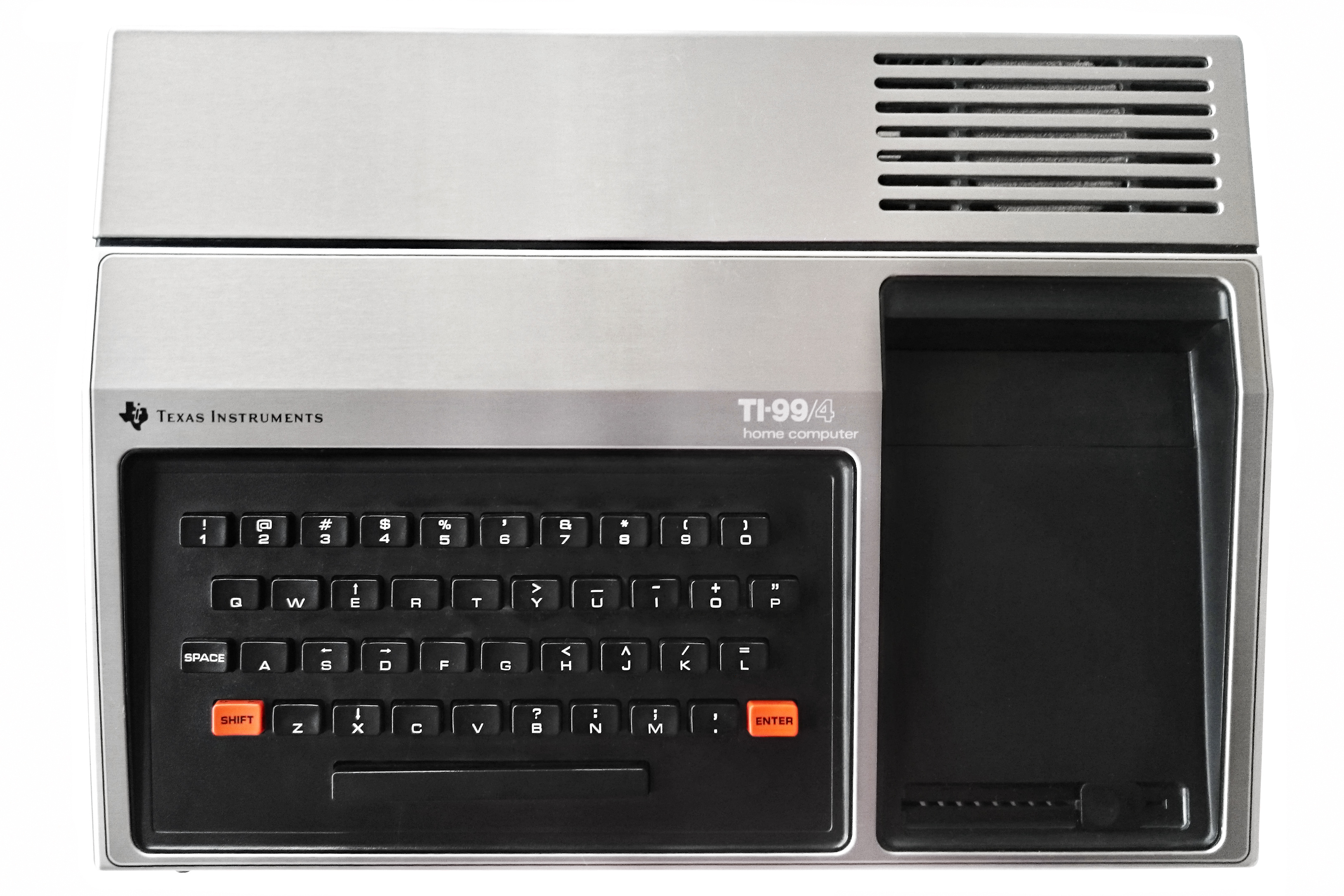
- Developer: Texas Instruments
- Manufacturer: Texas Instruments
- Type: Home computer
- Released: October 1979
- Introductory price: US$1,150 (equivalent to $5,100 in 2025)
- Discontinued: June 1981
- Units shipped: ≈20,000
- CPU: TMS9900 @ 3 MHz
- Graphics: TMS9918
- Successor: TI-99/4A

TI-99/4A

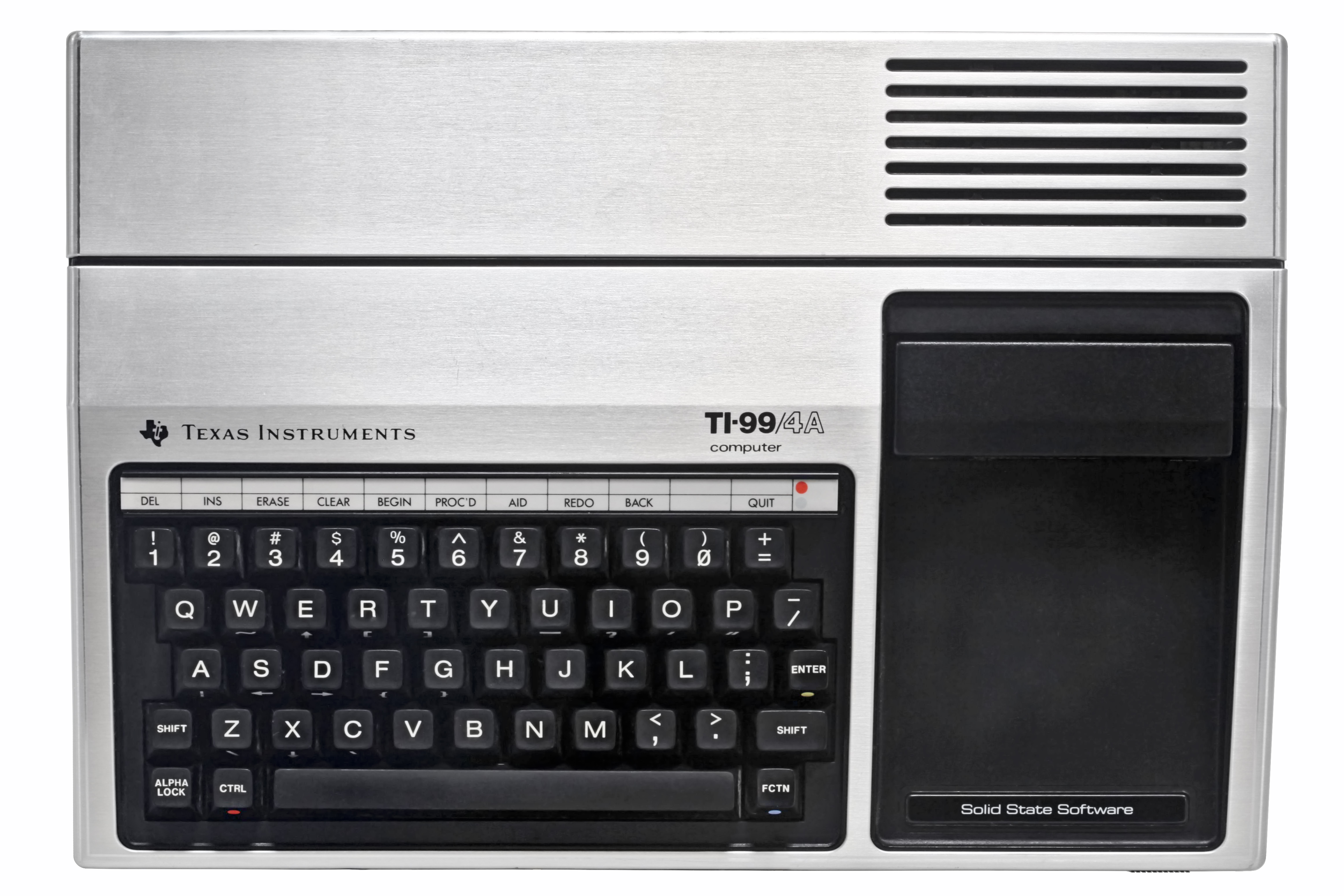
- Manufacturer: Texas Instruments
- Type: Home computer
- Released: June 1981
- Introductory price: US$525 (equivalent to $1,860 in 2025)
- Discontinued: March 1984
- Units shipped: 2.8 million
- Media: ROM cartridge; cassette; floppy disk
- Operating system: TI BASIC
- CPU: TMS9900 @ 3 MHz
- Memory: 16 KB RAM; 256 bytes scratchpad RAM
- Graphics: TMS9918A
- Sound: TMS9919, later SN94624
- Predecessor: TI-99/4

The TI-99/4 and TI-99/4A are home computers released by Texas Instruments (TI) in 1979 and 1981, respectively. Based on TI's own TMS9900 microprocessor originally used in minicomputers, the TI-99/4 was the first 16-bit home computer. The associated TMS9918 video display controller provides color graphics and sprite support which were only comparable with those of the Atari 400 and 800 released a month later. The TI-99 series also initially competed with the Apple II and TRS-80.

The calculator-style keyboard of the TI-99/4 and the high price were cited as weak points. TI's reliance on ROM cartridges and their practice of limiting developer information to select third parties resulted in a lack of software. The TI-99/4A was released in June 1981 with a simplified internal design, full-travel keyboard, and improved graphics. At half the price of the original model, sales picked up significantly and TI supported the 4A with peripherals, including a speech synthesizer and a "Peripheral Expansion System" box to contain hardware add-ons. TI released developer information and tools, but the insistence on remaining sole publisher continued to starve the platform of software. Architectural quirks of both models reduced the performance benefits of the 16-bit CPU.

The 1981 US launch of the TI-99/4A followed Commodore's VIC-20 by several months. Commodore CEO Jack Tramiel began a price war by repeatedly lowering the price of the VIC-20. In late 1982, TI was shipping 5,000 computers a day from their factory in Lubbock, Texas. By 1983, the 99/4A was selling at a loss for under US$100. Even with the increased user base created by the heavy discounts, TI lost US$330 million in the third quarter of 1983 and announced the discontinuation of the TI-99/4A in October 1983. Production ended in March 1984.

The TI-99/4 was intended to fit in the middle of a planned range of TI-99 computers, none of which were released, but prototypes and documentation have been found after the TI-99/4A was discontinued.

== Features ==
Developed by Texas Instruments (TI), the TI-99/4A is a self-contained console with the motherboard, ROM cartridge slot, and full-travel keyboard in the same case. The power supply is external. An RF modulator allows the use of a television as a monitor. Lowercase letters are displayed as small caps, rather than separate glyphs. TI BASIC, an ANSI-compliant BASIC interpreter based on Dartmouth BASIC, is built in and includes support for graphics, sound, and file system access. Later versions of the 99/4A, identified by (C)1983 TEXAS INSTRUMENTS V2.2 on the title page, prevent the use of unlicensed ROM cartridges from third-party manufacturers such as Atarisoft.

Both TI-99/4 models use the 16-bit TMS9900 CPU running at 3 MHz. The TMS9900 is a single-chip implementation of a TI-990 minicomputer. Although a full 16-bit processor, only the 8 KB system ROM and 256 bytes of scratchpad RAM are available on the 16-bit bus.

Peripherals include a 5¼″ floppy disk drive and controller, an RS-232 card with two serial ports and one parallel port, a P-code card for Pascal support, a thermal printer, a 300-baud acoustic coupler, a tape drive using standard audio cassettes as media, and a 32 KB memory expansion card.

=== Video Display Processor ===
Graphics in the 99/4A are generated by an TMS9918A NTSC Video Display Processor (VDP), with a variant for PAL territories. The VDP was developed by TI and also sold independently, allowing it to be used in other systems. It serves as the video processor for the ColecoVision and SG-1000 consoles; an earlier model is part of the MSX computer standard.

The TMS9918A supports character-based and bitmap display modes as well as hardware sprites. There are 32 single-color sprites total, but only a maximum of four can be displayed per scan line. Each sprite is either 8×8 or 16×16 pixels and can be scaled 2× to 16×16 or 32×32.

16 KB of RAM is provided for the Video Display Processor. VDP RAM is the largest block of writeable memory in the unexpanded TI-99/4A architecture, although the CPU does not have direct access to it, and requests reads and writes from the VDP as an intermediary. It is used for storing disk I/O buffers and TI BASIC user programs.

== Expansion ==
TI-99 peripherals contain device drivers in ROMs in the hardware. When a new peripheral is attached, it is immediately available for any software that wants to use it. All device access uses a generic file-based I/O mechanism, allowing new devices to be added without updating software. The Peripheral Expansion System can hold two RS-232 cards, for a total of four RS-232 ports and two parallel printer ports.

The computer supports two cassette drives through a dedicated port, using a custom data format. Composite video and audio are output through another port on NTSC-based machines, and combine through an external RF modulator for use with a television. PAL-based machines output a more complex YUV signal which is also modulated to UHF externally.

Two digital joysticks can be connected through a single DE-9 port—the same as the Atari joystick port, but with incompatible pins. Aftermarket adapters allow the use of Atari compatible joysticks.

TI sold an official 32 KB RAM expansion. The memory is not available to all uses. For example, an Extended Basic program is restricted to using 24 KB with the remaining 8 KB available for machine code routines. The Mini Memory plug-in module contains 4 KB of battery-backed RAM that can be used as a persistent RAM disk or to load a machine-code program.

=== Peripheral Expansion Box ===
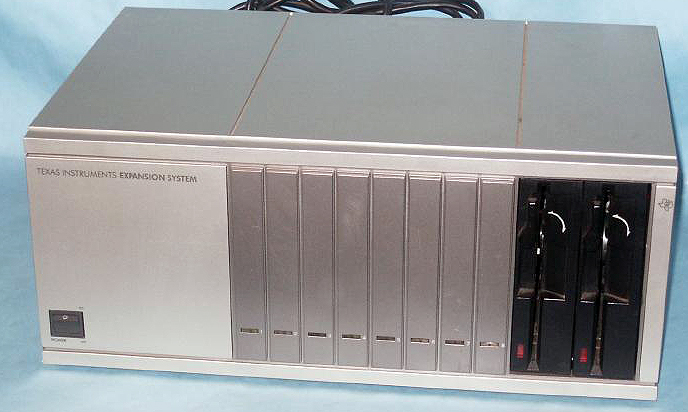
Peripheral Expansion Box or PEB

The TI-99/4A can be upgraded via expansion cards added to an eight-slot, external chassis containing its own linear power supply and a full-height 5¼" floppy bay. Encased in silver plastic, but made from sheet steel, this is labeled as the Peripheral Expansion System by TI, but usually called the Peripheral Expansion Box or PEB. Each card has an LED that blinks or flickers when being accessed by software. The section of the power supply that powers the card slots is unregulated. Each card has on-board regulators for its own requirements, which reduces power consumption on a partially-loaded PEB and allows for cards with unusual voltage requirements.

The PEB carries an analog sound input on the expansion bus, allowing the Speech Synthesizer's audio to be carried through the console to the monitor. The audio is also carried through the ribbon cable to the PEB, both allowing the relocation of the Speech Synthesizer to the PEB and the possibility of audio cards offering more features than the console's built-in sound. No official cards from TI do this.

Official cards from TI that were released and can be placed inside the PEB include

- 32 KB RAM expansion card
- RS-232 and parallel port card
- P-code card, implementing the UCSD p-system IV.0 by acting as a ROM-disk
- Diskette drive control card. The design allows controlling both drives internally in the PEB and external drives.

Peripherals designed to be used without the PEB also exist.

=== Speech synthesizer ===
TI-99/4A speech demo using the built-in vocabulary

In the late 1970s and early 1980s, TI was a pioneer in speech synthesis because of its LPC Speech Chips which were used in its Speak & Spell toys. A plug-in speech synthesizer module was available for the TI-99/4 and 4A. Speech synthesizers were offered free with the purchase of a number of cartridges and were used by video games such as Alpiner and Parsec. Alpiner's speech includes male and female voices and can be sarcastic when the player makes a bad move.

The synthesizer uses a variant of linear predictive coding and has a small in-built vocabulary. The original intent was to release small cartridges that plugged directly into the synthesizer unit to increase the device's vocabulary. However, the success of software text-to-speech in the Terminal Emulator II cartridge cancelled that plan.

== History ==
In the late 1970s, TI was a successful manufacturer of large computers and the largest semiconductor manufacturer in the world. In 1977, groups within TI were designing a video game console, a home computer to compete against the TRS-80 and Apple II, and a high-end business personal computer with a hard drive. The first two groups were both working at TI's consumer products division in Lubbock, Texas, and continually competed. According to Wally Rhines, the 99/4's "ultracheap keyboard" (with calculator-style keys), RF modulator, and ROM cartridges came from the console design. The Lubbock teams were merged and directed towards the home computer market.

Others within the company persuaded the Lubbock group to use TI's TMS9900 CPU. This was in keeping with TI's "one company, one computer architecture" concept, where a single processor model would scale from consoles to its high-end minicomputers. The TMS9900 is a single-chip implementation of TI's 16-bit TI-990 minicomputer, and is the CPU in low-end models of that platform. Feature-limited single-chip versions of popular minicomputer designs from the 1960s were popular in the mid-1970s and newly designed 16-bit and 32-bit CPUs like the Intel 8086 and Motorola 68000, respectively, quickly rendered these earlier designs obsolete. Many of the TMS9900's quirky features, like processor registers in main memory, came from its minicomputer roots where such concepts were more common.

The team working on the high-end personal computer was merged into TI's Data Systems Division, which had the TI 990 and various computer terminals; the division ended the personal computer because it was a threat to the minicomputer. TI's European headquarters worked on another home computer, where a third party consulting firm was contracted to produce a prototype codenamed "Mojo". This was based on TI's version of the 8-bit Intel 8080 supported by an all-TI chip set. After a series of discussions, Mojo was abandoned and the Consumer Products concept moved forward.

=== 99/4 ===
TI's catalog included a huge variety of analog and digital integrated circuits already widely used in microcomputers, giving it a single-source advantage no other company could meet. TI used this position to take over markets, as it did in the mid-1970s introducing its first scientific calculators. These underpriced its former customers like Commodore and drove them out of the calculator business. Observers expected TI would do the same to the microcomputer market if it released a competitive system. The New York Times suggested that the entry of TI and Hewlett-Packard would reshape the entire industry.

Through the development period, several companies attempting to enter the home computer market were faced with significant pushback from the Federal Communications Commission (FCC). The FCC had developed new rules for consumer devices that connected directly to televisions in an effort to control ongoing complaints about interference by poorly shielded devices. Televisions of the era generally had only a single antenna input, and thus connecting to them required the internal video signal of the device to be converted to radio frequency using an RF modulator. If these were poorly shielded the signal would leak out and could be picked up in the antennas of nearby televisions.

The new rules were extremely stringent and difficult to meet. TI continued battling the FCC both in the lab and in Congress, where it had considerable power due to its position within Texas's high-tech industry. It failed to meet the FCC requirements as the release date approached. The company eventually gave up and bundled a modified Zenith Electronics television with the computer, as a computer monitor, eliminating the need for the RF modulator by connecting directly to the TV's internal circuitry using a composite video signal. This put the introductory price at US$1,150 (equivalent to $4,494 in 2025).

The 99/4 sold poorly. Very little software was available, as few developers ported their products to its 16-bit CPU. The machine was met with almost universal disdain when it was released. Every review complained about the keyboard, the lack of lower case characters, any sort of expansion, and lack of software. In July 1980, Adam Osborne reported that, despite poor sales, TI had raised the price of a complete system to $1,400, higher than the popular Apple II, which started at $950. Osborne said, "Some dealers, who have offered the complete system (including the monitor) for less than the price of the Apple, have still been unable to sell it". TI experimented with $200 rebates, and dealers decreased the price to as low as $699 not including rebates, but the company sold fewer than 20,000 computers by summer 1981, less than one tenth Apple or Radio Shack's volume. Atari, Inc. had an installed base of Atari 8-bit computers more than twice as large. David H. Ahl described the 99/4 as "vastly overpriced, particularly considering its strange keyboard, non-standard Basic, and lack of software". The New York Times called it an "embarrassing failure".

=== 99/4A ===
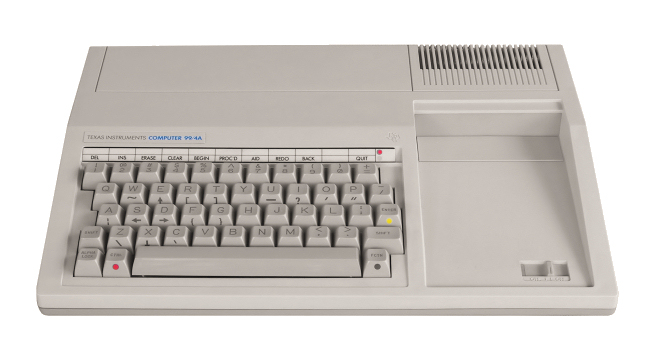
Late period, cost-reduced version of the TI-99/4A with beige case

In May 1981 TI released the 99/4A. With a lower $525 price, the company added a typewriter-style keyboard—keeping the non-standard layout—and more expansion options. The expansion system extends from the right side of the chassis, with modules that can be daisy-chained. There is a practical limitation to this, because each module increases the width of the system. The price was initially US$525, less than half that of the 99/4.

TI continued lowering the price through 1981, first to $449.95, and then to $399.95 in early 1982, in competition with Commodore's $300 VIC-20. This turned into a price war with Commodore. TI responded by cutting the wholesale price of the 99 by $100, while also offering a $100 rebate directly to consumers, lowering the street price to about $200. Bill Cosby in advertising for TI marketed the refund. By mid-1982, Jerry Pournelle wrote that TI was "practically giving away the TI-99/4A". An industry joke stated that the company was losing money on each computer, but was making up for it in volume. Commodore matched the $200 price in December 1982.

TI celebrated the 99/4A's market success at the January 1983 Consumer Electronics Show in Las Vegas, where Cosby joked how easy it was to sell a computer by paying people $100 to buy one. Sales peaked at 30,000 a week that month, but on 10 January 1983 Commodore lowered the price of its computers. In February TI responded with a 99/4A retail price of $150. In April, the VIC-20's bundled retail price reached $100 and the 99/4A followed suit. In the spring of 1983, TI attempted to reduce the parts count to maintain a competitive edge by combining multiple chips into a single custom chip, renaming the 4A PCB as a "QI" (Quality Improved) board and began production of plastic beige cases without the former aluminum trim of the black console. In May, it began offering the PEB for free with the purchase of three peripherals. In August the company reduced prices of peripherals by 50% and offered $100 of free software; in September, it reduced software prices by up to 43%. The $100 rebate ended in April 1983, but by then TI had effectively reduced the retail price by that amount; by June the 99/4A sold for as little as $99 in some stores, comparable to the VIC-20's price.

=== Lack of third-party development ===
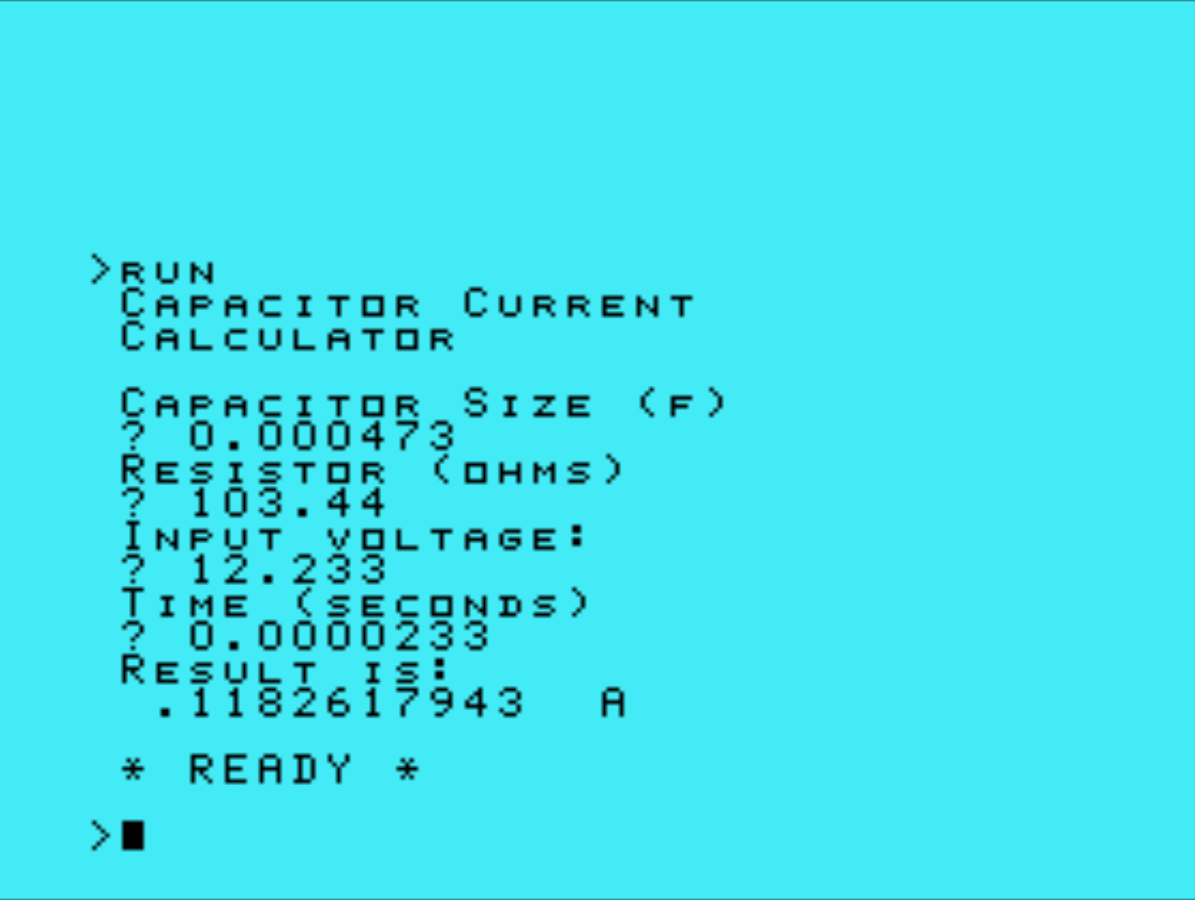
A BASIC program running on a TI-99/4A

The president of Spectravideo later said that "TI got suckered by" Jack Tramiel, head of Commodore. The company could not make a profit on the TI-99/4A at a price of $99—it was much more expensive to manufacture than the VIC-20—but hoped that selling many inexpensive computers would increase sales of more profitable software and peripherals. Because such a razor and blades business model requires that such products be its own, TI strictly controlled development for the computer, discouraging hobbyists and third-party developers. It wanted unsophisticated consumers to buy its computers like an appliance, and not technical users who might want to write their own software, despite the latter being what Pournelle described as "a large unpaid R&D department" for computer companies. The company advertised its calculators in almost every issue of BYTE starting in 1980, but deliberately excluded its home computer from the ads except briefly in late 1982. TI also used its preexisting calculator sales channel of mass-market retailers, and not specialized computer stores.

TI did not provide an editor, assembler, or hardware technical information when it released the computer. Pournelle stated that "TI's message is loud and clear: 'Drop dead, hobbyists!'", and added that the company "worked very hard at keeping you outside the machine". Citing Money, publisher of Kilobaud Microcomputing Wayne Green reported in August 1980 that TI planned to have only 100 applications available by the end of 1981, stating that "This tiny figure has to put a chill on the whole industry". Green's company, Instant Software, was a prolific publisher for the TRS-80 but could not find anyone to port software to the TI. He wrote, "We understand the problems with the system and the efforts Texas Instruments made to make translation difficult". A Spinnaker Software executive said that the 99/4A had "the worst software in the business", and Ahl noted that unlike other computers, it did not have "Microsoft BASIC, VisiCalc, WordStar, or any popular games". Peripherals cost about twice as much as for other computers. TI joysticks were of poor quality and difficult to find, for example; one reseller reported that its best-selling product was the Atari CX40 joystick adapter cable.

Pournelle added, "TI had rightly concluded that the hobbyists and hackers were a tiny part of the market and wrongly concluded that they were therefore unimportant". Rivals were more open with information. Kilobaud Microcomputing reported that a Commodore executive promised the VIC-20 would have "enough additional documentation to enable an experienced programmer/hobbyist to get inside and let his imagination work". Even when competitors did not disclose technical information, because their computers used commercial off-the-shelf parts like MOS 6502 and Zilog Z80, much more information was public than for TI's proprietary components. IBM learned from TI's mistake, Pournelle said. The company released software and hardware technical information when the IBM PC was announced in 1981, stating that "the definition of a personal computer is third-party hardware and software".

TI had also learned from its mistake and no longer ignored hobbyists, Pournelle said in 1982. The company advertised in BYTE its program for publishing others' software, and job openings for software developers. By mid-1983 more than 1000 applications were available. TI insisted on being the sole publisher for the system, however, which many developers refused to agree to. After third-party developers' games for the Atari 2600 became very successful, the company at the June 1983 Consumer Electronics Show announced that only cartridges with a TI-licensed lockout chip would work in the 99/4A. TI held a patent on a program counter implemented in software in GROM, which a future operating system revision would require in cartridges. The Boston Phoenix predicted that "most [software developers] just won't bother making TI-compatible versions of their programs", and Pournelle wrote that "TI once again tells the hobbyists to drop dead".

No official technical documentation from TI was released until the "Editor/Assembler" development suite was announced in 1981 and released in 1982, and no system schematics were ever released to the public until after TI had discontinued the computer.

=== Discontinuation ===
After TI in mid-1983 unexpectedly announced a $100 million loss in the second calendar quarter—implying a pretax loss from home computers of $200–250 million—its stock dropped by one third in two days. The Times stated in June 1983 that Cosby's $100 refund "joke is no longer funny", and that "future options are slim". The low price affected the 99/4A's reputation; "When they went to $99, people started asking 'What's wrong with it?'", one retail executive said. An L.F. Rothschild sell-side analyst estimated that TI had prepared to manufacture three million computers in 1983, but would only be able to sell two million; another analyst forecast one million for the year.

Some observers predicted after the second quarter's loss that the 99/4A would not be able to recover; even if the company did not plan to discontinue the computer, the fear that it would become orphaned technology might cause retailers to avoid ordering inventory. The computer's price likely also affected TI's razor-and-blades strategy; InfoWorld asked, "Do you really think a person who is serious about joining the ranks of home-computer owners will want to spend $49.95 for a program to run on a $99 computer?" Others thought that TI could sell excess inventory and continue producing the computer. After losing $111 million after taxes in the third calendar quarter of 1983, TI announced plans to discontinue the 99/4A, while continuing to sell the TI Professional MS-DOS-compatible computer. (TI stock rose by 25% after the announcement, because the company's other businesses were strong.) With another TI price cut, retailers sold remaining inventory of the former $1,150 computer during Christmas for $49. The 90 Child World stores quickly sold over 40,000 computers at a price referred to as "nearly a stocking stuffer" by the Times. By January 1984 the 99/4A was reportedly almost impossible to find in stores. Consumers also bought up remaining software and accessories, also discounted.

A total of 2.8 million units were shipped before the TI-99/4A was discontinued in March 1984, perhaps the largest installed base among all personal computers. The 99/4A became the first in a series of home computers to be orphaned by their manufacturer over the next few years, along with the Coleco Adam, Mattel Aquarius, Timex Sinclair 1000, and IBM PCjr.

== Architecture ==
In order to build a complete 16-bit system, TI would have had to redesign many of their existing 8-bit support chips. Instead, TI decided to use existing devices for the majority of the system. The result is that only a small portion of the system is 16-bit and uses a second 8-bit computer bus for the rest.

One of the key features of the TMS9900 from the minicomputer design that spawned it is the inclusion of several sets of processor registers. In a minicomputer setting, the system was typically running a time-sharing or multitasking operating system, or being used for real-time computing, both of which benefit from being able to quickly switch among programs. To do this, the TMS9900 stores several sets of registers in main memory and can switch between the sets of sixteen 16-bit registers by changing the single workspace pointer register, thereby allowing very rapid context switching.

The new design put 256 bytes of random-access memory (RAM) on the 16-bit bus to store up to eight sets of registers. This area of RAM is known as the "scratchpad memory". As the processor's instructions are all 16-bit as well, the 8 KB internal system read-only memory (ROM) was also on the 16-bit side. Only the program counter, status register, and workspace pointer registers are actually implemented on the chip itself.

Included on the 8-bit side of the system is the majority of the RAM and almost all of the support chips, especially the video display controller (VDP). All accesses to the VDP system are executed eight bits at a time. The system's RAM is managed by the VDP, which provides access to the CPU only when the VDP is not using the memory. This means that user programs and data are read over two machine cycles, reducing speed by half. According to TI's former manager for microprocessors who oversaw TMS9900 development, this negates the performance advantage of a 16-bit processor.

The TMS9900's machine language instructions must be word-aligned, so at least 16-bits are needed for every instruction. At the time, memory was expensive, so the size of this format was a concern. Additionally, programming the 8-bit side of the system from 16-bit code is somewhat complex. To address this, TI developed a pseudo–assembly language known as "Graphic Programming Language", or GPL. This is a compact 8-bit language interpreted by the CPU which dynamically translates the GPL instructions into one or more TMS9900 instructions. GPL includes utility routines that appear as single instructions in GPL code, such as clearing a block of memory. All software originally distributed on ROM cartridges were written using GPL, and are sometimes referred to as GROMs.

At the time of launch, the system included only a single user-accessible programming language: TI's built-in BASIC interpreter, written in GPL. On the Creative Computing Benchmark, it runs at roughly half the speed of the Apple II.

Computers manufactured from August 1983 and later may have the lockout chip preventing use of unlicensed cartridges. Such "QI" units have a 1983 copyright date at bootup.

== Technical specifications ==
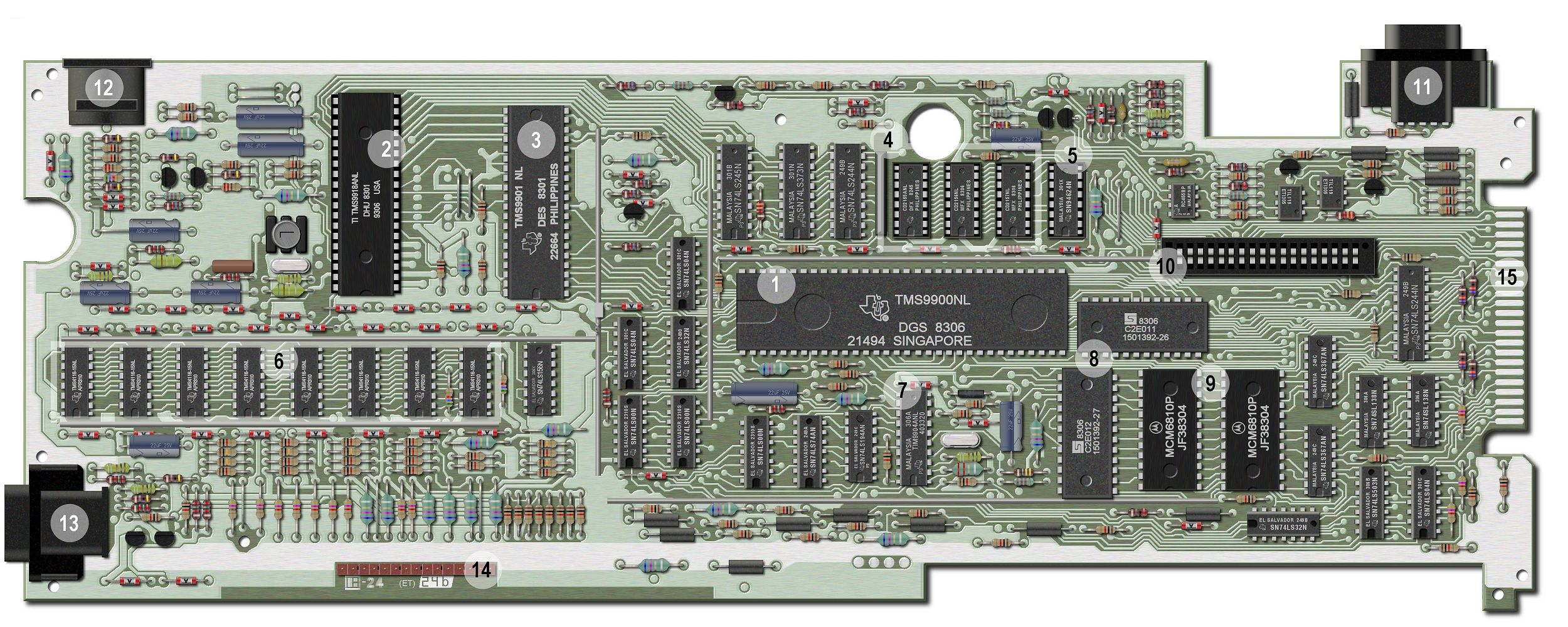
Rendering of the TI-99/4A circuit board

=== CPU ===
TMS9900 @ 3 MHz, 16-bit, 64-pin DIP

=== Memory ===
- 8 KB of monitor ROM and GPL interpreter
- 8 KB of RAM, if memory expansion is not attached
- 24 KB RAM, if memory expansion is attached
- 8 KB allocated to expansion devices (e.g. disk drive controller)
- 8 KB allocated to ROM/RAM in expansion cartridges
- 256 bytes scratchpad RAM for the CPU
- Memory ports for Video Display Processor, sound, speech etc.
- 16 KB Video Display Processor RAM accessible via the VDP (not in CPU's memory map)
- 18KB GPL GROM (6KB GPL OS support, 12KB TI Basic GPL GROM Language)

=== Video ===
TMS9918A video display processor, 40 pin DIP. The earlier 99/4 uses the TMS9918. PAL systems use the "9929" versions of each.

- 32 single-color sprites in defined layers allowing higher-numbered sprites to transparently flow over lower-numbered sprites. Sprites are available at 8×8 pixels or 16×16 pixels, with a "magnify" bit that doubled all sprites' size but not their resolution. A single bit is available in hardware for collision detection, and the console supports automatic movement via an interrupt routine in the ROM. There can only be 4 visible sprites per scan line.
- 16 fixed colors (15 visible, one color reserved for "transparent" which shows the background color). Transparent is intended for the 9918's genlock which is disabled in the system.
- Text mode: 40×24 characters (256 6×8 user-definable characters, no sprites, foreground and background color only, not accessible in BASIC, standard in the p-system/Pascal, assembly editor and word processor)
- Graphics mode: 32×24 characters (256 8×8 user-definable characters), full 15 color palette + transparent (available in groups of 8 through the character table) and 32 sprites (The only mode available in BASIC. Extended BASIC is required for sprites, and can access only 28 of them.)
- Bitmap mode: 256×192 pixels (no more than two colors in an eight-pixel row, full 15 color palette + transparent, all 32 sprites available but interrupt-based motion through the ROM routine is not due to the memory layout, not available to BASIC or the original 9918).
- Multicolor mode: 64×48 pixels (each pixel may be any color, all 32 sprites are available)
- All of the above comprise 36 layers starting with the video overlay input, then the background color, then two graphics mode layers, then a layer for each of the 32 sprites. A higher layer obscures a lower layer in hardware, unless that higher layer is transparent.

=== Sound ===
TMS9919, later SN94624, identical to the SN76489 used in many other systems

- 3 voices, 1 noise (white or periodic)
- Voices generate square waves from 110 Hz to approximately 115 kHz
- Console ROM includes interrupt-driven music playback

== Games ==
TI Invaders is a 1981 clone of Space Invaders.

Roughly 100 games were published for the TI-99/4A, with most published by Texas Instruments. Some of the games released only for the 99/4A are Parsec, Alpiner, Tombstone City: 21st Century, Tunnels of Doom, and The Attack. TI Invaders and Car Wars are TI's renditions of Space Invaders and Head On respectively. Munch Man is similar to Pac-Man, but the title character fills the maze with a pattern rather than emptying it of dots.

The Adventure International text adventures require the Adventure Command Module cartridge. Tigervision offered a solution to the memory limitation of the standard cartridge slot in the form of a 24 KB memory expansion cartridge that attached to the side expansion interface, emulating an expansion device. This allowed the company to implement a larger game completely in machine code, which was used for Espial and Miner 2049er. Exceltec also released two similar side cartridges: Arcturus and Killer Caterpillar.

The media criticized the computer's game library as mediocre. TI not only discouraged third-party development, including games, but it also failed to license popular arcade games like Zaxxon and Frogger.

== Unreleased hardware ==
=== Hex-Bus ===
The Hex-Bus interface was designed in 1982 and intended for commercial release in late 1983. It connects the console to peripherals via a high-speed serial link. Though it is similar to today's USB (plug and play, hot-swappable, etc.), it was never released, with only a small number of prototypes appearing in collector hands after TI pulled out of the market.

=== TI-99/4A successors ===
The TI-99/4 was intended to fit in the middle of a planned range of TI-99 computers, with prototypes and documentation created for other models. Initial plans were for a lower-end TI-99/2 and a more powerful TI-99/8. Later ideas for expanding the range included a bargain-priced TI-99/3, a terminal TI-99/7, and a direct follow-up to the TI-99/4A referred to as either TI-99/4B or TI-99/5.

At the time they left the home computer market, TI had been actively developing two successors to the TI-99/4A that went through several prototypes but never entered production. Some of these prototypes are now in the hands of TI-99/4A collectors. Both machines would have been substantially faster than the original TI-99/4A and used the Hex-Bus serial interface.

- TI-99/2, a 4K RAM, 32K ROM computer with no color, sound, or joystick port and a Mylar keyboard. TI designed the computer in four and a half months to sell for under $100 and compete with the Sinclair ZX81 and Timex Sinclair 1000. Based on the TMS9995 CPU running at 10.7 MHz and with a built-in RF modulator, performance greatly increased when the screen was blank. The University of Southwestern Louisiana developed system software. 99/2 software ran on the 99/4A, but not vice versa. Working prototypes appeared at the January 1983 Consumer Electronic Show (CES). By mid-1983 the 99/4A sold for $99, however. The company canceled the 99/2 in April 1983, but planned to exhibit it at the June CES until other companies' press conferences there indicated that competition would increase.
- TI-99/8 and 99/6. The 99/8 reportedly had a $200 wholesale price. Privately shown to dealers but not announced at June CES, it was formally canceled in October 1983. It included 64 KB of RAM expandable to 15 megabytes, a larger keyboard, built-in speech synthesis, built-in UCSD Pascal operating environment, and the full 16-bit data bus available on the expansion port. It was abandoned in the prototype stage. The Multi Emulator Super System is capable of running what are believed to be the system's ROMs.

== Legacy ==
The Tomy Tutor and its sibling systems are Japanese computers similar in architecture and firmware to the 99/8. Unlike the 99/8, it was released commercially, but sold poorly outside Japan. Portions of the operating system and BASIC code are similar to the 99/8.

The annual Chicago TI Faire is in its 44th year as of 2026, where people celebrate the TI-99 family of computers.

=== Post-TI development ===
The Myarc Geneve 9640 is an enhanced TI-99/4A clone built by Myarc as a card to fit into the TI Peripheral Expansion System. It uses an IBM PC/XT detached keyboard. Released in 1987, it is similar to the unreleased TI-99/8 system. It includes a 12 MHz TMS9995 processor, enhanced graphics with 80-column text mode, 16-bit wide RAM, MDOS, and is compatible with nearly all TI software and slot-mounted hardware. A toggle switch slows the computer to the speed of the original.

The Second Generation CPU card (SGCPU) was released by the System 99 User Group in 1996 as a card to be installed in the PEB.

In 2004, a Universal Serial Bus card and Advanced Technology Attachment controller for Integrated drive electronics (IDE) hard disks for the PEB were released.

A range of plug-in cartridge boards have been developed, allowing software projects to be distributed on cartridge.

The Phoenix G2, was designed in 2010 by Gary Smith, a member of TI-User Group UK. It uses two FPGAs to emulate the entire architecture of the Myarc Geneve 9640 and the TMS9995 microprocessor. It incorporates an SD card reader, Ethernet, VGA output, and 64 MB RAM.

An FPGA-based TMS9918 compatible graphics chip, called the F18A, is a drop-in replacement for the original 9918 VDP, but features VGA output, bypassing the TMS9918A's native composite output, and contains other enhancements such as removal of the restriction of 4 sprites per scan line.

== See also ==
- Compact Computer 40 (1983)
- Texas Instruments Professional Computer (1983 – c. 1985)
- Texas Instruments Professional Portable Computer (1983)
