= Bias frame =

Digital image taken with no exposure to capture sensor noise

In digital photography, a bias frame is an image obtained from an opto-electronic image sensor, with no actual exposure time. The image so obtained only contains unwanted signal due to the electronics that elaborate the sensor data, and not unwanted signal from charge accumulation (e.g. from dark current) within the sensor itself.

A bias frame is complementary to a dark frame, which has a charge integration time but in darkness. Since a dark frame contains unwanted signal including a fixed-pattern noise component, some of which corresponds to the bias frame, and some of which is due to dark current and is proportional to the exposure time, it is possible to obtain an image representing only the dark-current component by subtracting a bias frame from a dark frame. The resulting image allows obtaining an "artificial" dark frame when multiplied by a factor depending on exposure time and then added back to the bias frame. Although this technique is less accurate than shooting a dark frame for each specific exposure duration, it has the advantage of drastically reducing the time needed to obtain dark-frame data for dark frame subtraction.

== See also ==
- Flat-field correction
- Dark-frame subtraction
