= Photo response non-uniformity =

Noise in digital sensors

In digital photography, the photo response non-uniformity, pixel response non-uniformity, or PRNU is a form of fixed-pattern noise related to digital image sensors, as used in cameras and optical instruments. Both CCD and CMOS sensors are two-dimensional arrays of photosensitive cells, each broadly corresponding to an image pixel. Due to the non-uniformity of image sensors, each cell responds with a different voltage level when illuminated with a uniform light source, and this leads to luminance inaccuracy at the pixel level. The PRNU has applications in digital imaging, such as the production of digital cameras, and digital forensics.

== Forensic use ==
The PRNU of a device's imaging sensor is unique to that device. It creates a non-changing, unique noise pattern, which is embedded in the pixels of each photo. PRNU-based identification of a photo's source (i.e., a specific camera) is possible even when the resulting picture has been post-processed and manipulated, but specific purposefully designed post-processing techniques can occasionally deceive PRNU-based analysis.

== Metrology camera corrections ==
High-end and metrology camera vendors tend to characterize this non-uniformity during instrument manufacture. The sensor is illuminated with a standardized light source and a two-dimensional table of correction factors is generated. This table is either carried in camera non-volatile memory and dynamically applied to the image on each capture, or ships with the camera to be applied by an external image processing and correcting pipeline.

== See also ==
- Color balance
- Color correction
- Fixed-pattern noise
- Flat-field correction
- Image sensor
