= Dark current =

Dark current may refer to:

- Dark current (biochemistry), the depolarizing current, carried by Na^{+} ions that flows into a photoreceptor cell when unstimulated
- Dark current (physics):, the electric current that flows through a photosensitive device when no photons are entering the device
