= MicroSolutions Backpack =

MicroSolutions Backpack was a line of peripheral devices introduced in 1990 allowing users to attach a peripheral drive, namely hard drives, CD-ROM drives, and DVD±RW drives, to their system. When the original model was released, USB ports did not yet exist, so the drive plugged into a system's printer port. Backpacks could be daisy-chained and still allow for printer usage. Some models also offered audio capability via expansion. Later models introduced faster connectivity to the host system by means of a proprietary PC Card, and later USB. MicroSolutions was located in DeKalb, Illinois, USA.
