= Hex-Bus =

Early experimental perpheral interconnect

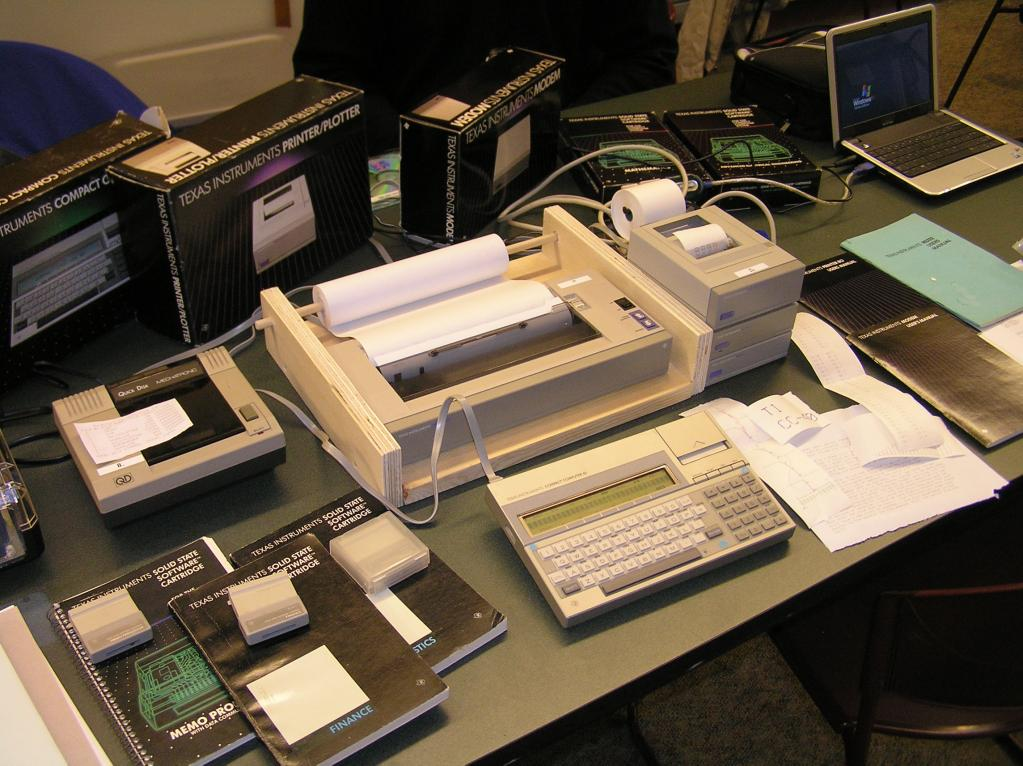
Daisy chained Hex-Bus peripherals

The Texas Instruments Hex-Bus interface (sometimes used unhyphenated as Hex Bus and with varying capitalization) was designed in 1982 and intended for commercial release in late 1983. It connects the console to peripherals via a high-speed serial link. Though it was prototypical to today's USB (plug and play, hot-swappable, etc.), it was never released, with only a small number of prototypes appearing in the hands of collectors after TI pulled out of the market.

Several Hex-Bus peripherals were planned or produced. A WaferTape drive never made it past the prototype stage due to reliability issues with the tapes. The 5.25-inch floppy drive also never made it past the prototype stage, even though it worked. Prototype DSDD disk controllers and video controllers were also made. A 4-color printer-plotter, a 300-baud modem, RS-232 interface, an 80-column thermal/ink printer, and a 2.8" "Quick Disk" drive were the only peripherals released in quantity, mostly for use with the TI CC-40. All Hex-Bus peripherals could be used with a TI-99/4A when connected through the Hex-Bus Interface, through direct connection to the TI-99/8, or through direct connection to the Compact Computer 40.

== Devices ==
- HX-1000 Printer/Plotter
- HX-1010 Printer 80
- HX-2000 Wafertape drive
- HX-3000 RS-232 interface
- HX-3100 Modem
- HX-3200 Centronics Printer Interface
- HX-5102 Disk Drive/Controller
- Quick Disk QD-02

=== Connector ===
The DockBus of the TI-74 is electrically identical.
