= Dark-frame subtraction =

Method of reducing image noise in long-exposure photographs

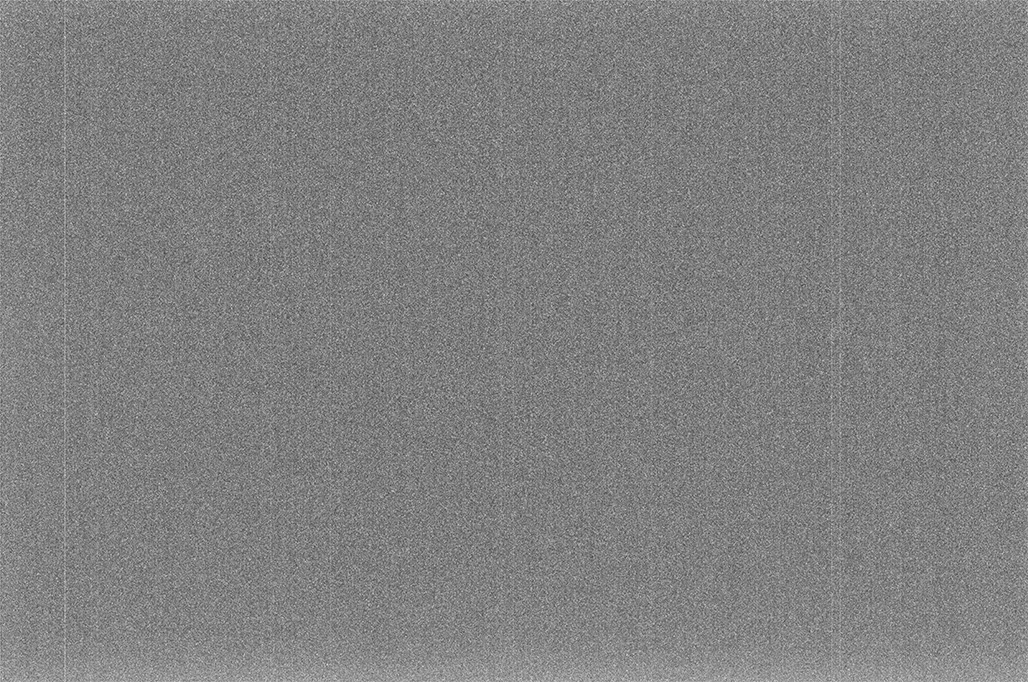
A dark frame from a Nikon D300 with enhanced contrast to emphasise noise

In digital photography, dark-frame subtraction is a way to reduce image noise in photographs shot with long exposure times, at high ISO sensitivity or at high temperatures. It takes advantage of two components of image noise that remain the same from one shot to the next, dark current and fixed-pattern noise. Noise from the image sensor includes hot pixels, which light up more brightly than surrounding pixels. The technique works by taking a picture with the shutter closed and subtracting that electronically from the original photo exhibiting the noise.

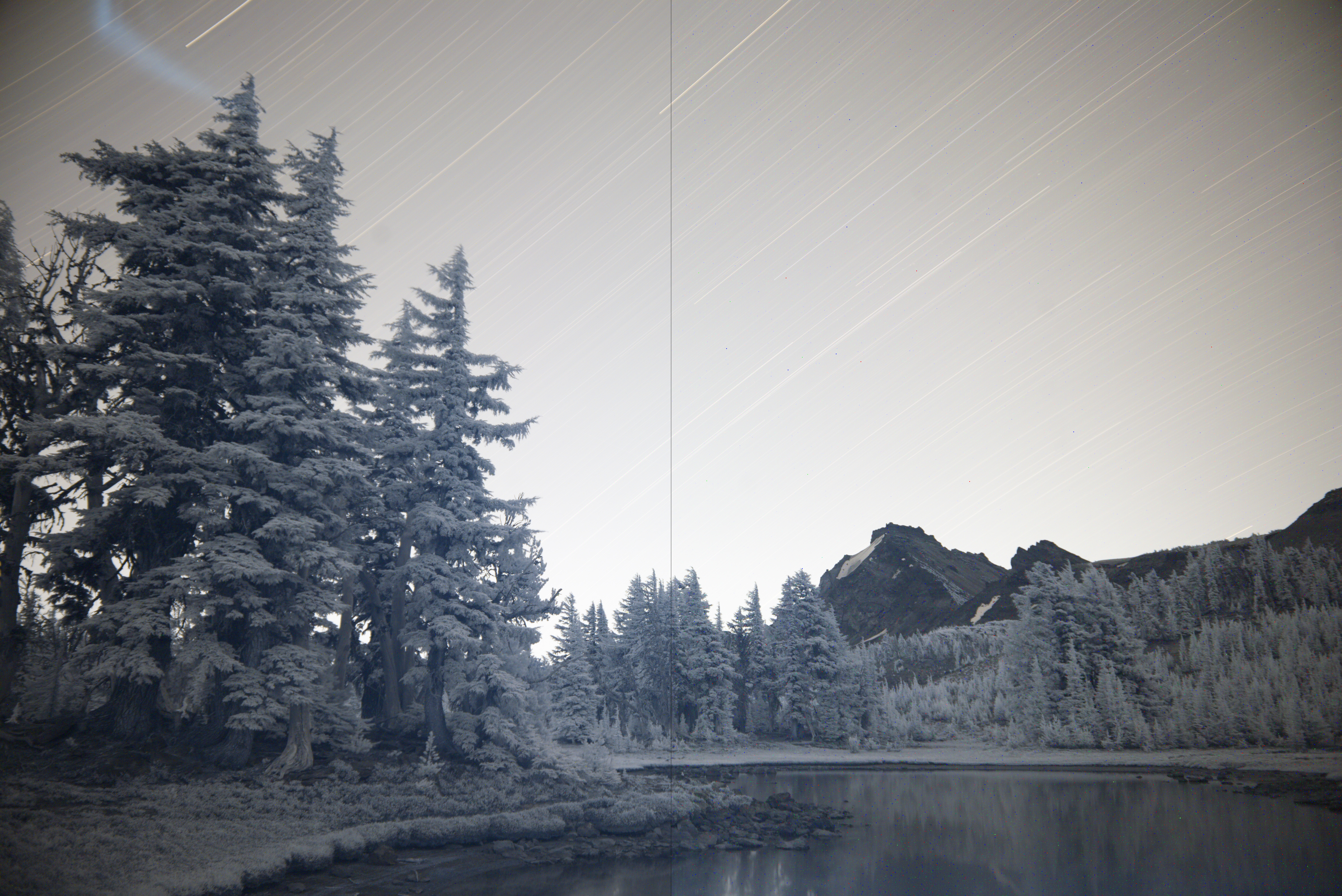
Dark-frame subtraction has been applied to the left half of the image. The right half is directly from the image sensor.

A dark frame is an image captured with the sensor in complete darkness (i.e. with a closed shutter or the lens and viewfinder capped). Such a dark frame is essentially an image of noise produced by the sensor. A dark frame, or an average of several dark frames, can then be subtracted from subsequent images to correct for fixed-pattern noise.

It is important that dark frames are taken at the same ISO sensitivity and exposure time as the original photo, because the brightness of fixed pixel noise is dependent on both. Under these circumstances, a single dark frame can be subtracted from multiple photos taken at these parameters, amounting to a time saving and allowing noise reduction for stacked star trail images, which do not allow interruption.

Dark-frame subtraction is also used in digital photogrammetry, to improve the contrast of satellite and air photograms, and is considered a best practice, along with flat-field correction, for astrophotography.

== See also ==
- Bias frame
- Flat-field correction
