= Hella Zippy =

- Type: Optical connector

Production history
- Designer: Intel
- Designed: 2009
- Hot pluggable: Yes
- Daisy chain: Yes
- External: Yes
- Cable: 100 m maximum length

Data
- Data signal: Yes
- Bitrate: 50 Gbit/s (demonstrated) 1000 Gbit/s (claimed)
- Protocol: Multiple

Hella Zippy is Intel's code-name for a high-speed integrated, end-to-end, silicon-based optical system. The prototype of this technology is essentially a two-chip system that can optically transmit and receive data at 50 Gbit/s or higher. A transmitter chip uses four hybrid silicon lasers running at 12.5 Gbit/s each and operating at different wavelengths. The lasers are essentially part of the silicon wafer, eliminating the need for a separate optical module, as in Light-Peak. The reason for this design is due to the increased need for transferring data at very high speeds and the only way to achieve this is to introduce Optical Technology. Copper becomes a bottleneck at 10 Gbit/s. Silicon-based optical interconnects are also highly immune to errors. Hella Zippy is predicted to supersede Intel's own Light Peak in the coming years.

== See also ==
- Thunderbolt (interface) Light Peak
- Ethernet
- LAN party
- LAN
- FireWire
