= Rotronics Wafadrive =

Magnetic tape peripheral for the ZX Spectrum

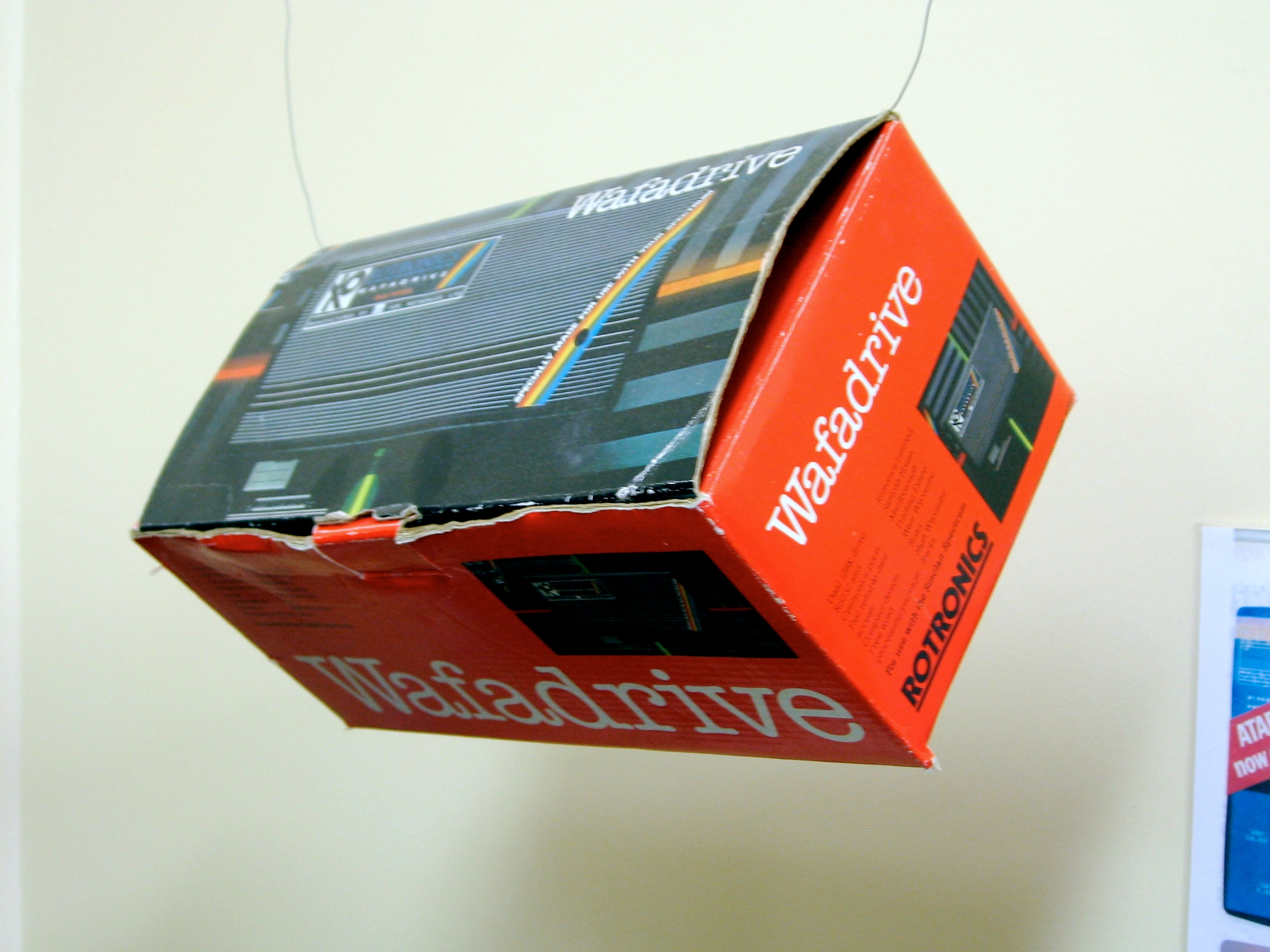
Wafadrive packaging

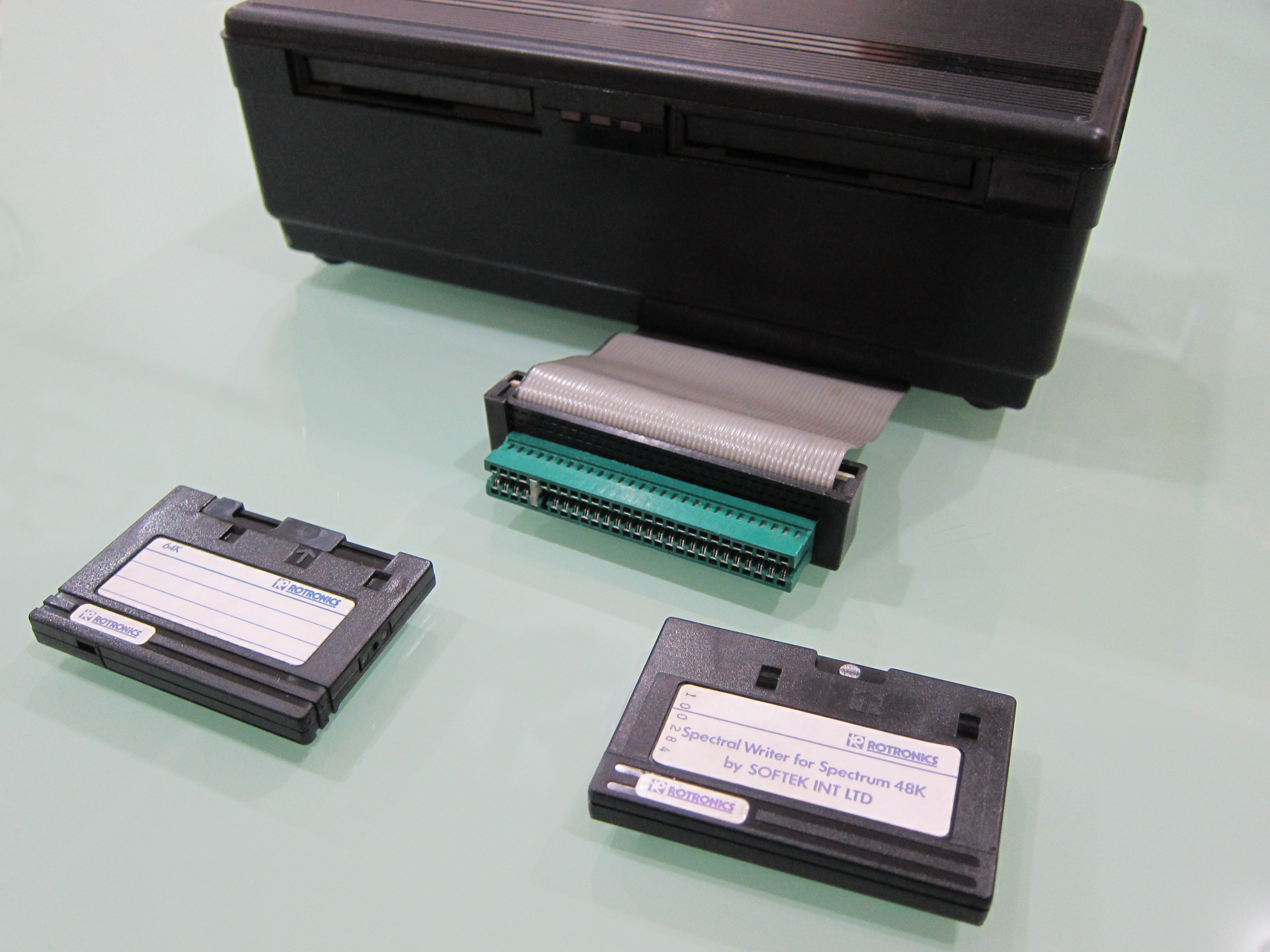
Rotronics Wafadrive shown with two Wafa tapes, a blank 64 kB and software release tape

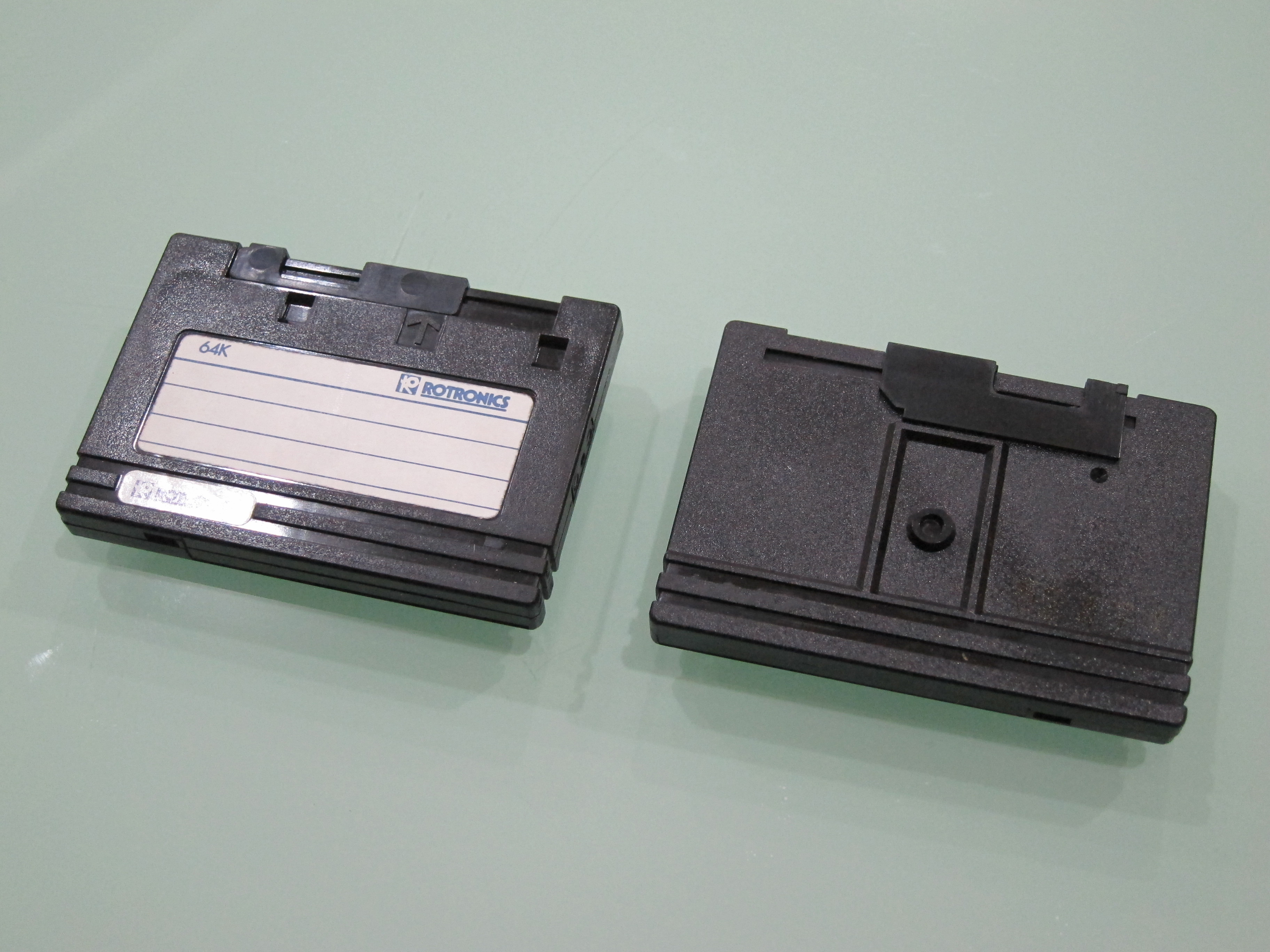
Front and back of a Rotronics 64 kB Wafa tape

The Rotronics Wafadrive is a magnetic tape storage peripheral launched in late 1984 for the ZX Spectrum home computer. Each tape is a continuous loop, unlike cassette tape. It was intended to compete with Sinclair's ZX Interface 1 and ZX Microdrive.

The Wafadrive comprises two continuous loop stringy floppy tape drives, an RS-232 interface and Centronics parallel port. The drives can run at two speeds: High speed (for seeking) and low speed (for reading/writing, which was significantly slower than that of Microdrives). The cartridges (or "wafers"), the same as those used in Entrepo stringy floppy devices for other microcomputers, are physically larger than Microdrive cartridges. They were available in three different capacities, nominally 16 kB, 64 kB or 128 kB. The larger sizes had the disadvantage of slower access, due to the longer length of tape.

The same drive mechanism, manufactured by BSR, and cartridges were used in at least the following similar devices:

- Quick Data Drive (QDD), designed to connect to the cassette port of Commodore 64 and VIC-20 home computers.
- A&J Micro Drive System 100, for TRS-80 Model 100 and it's clones (Kyotronic KC-85, NEC PC-8201 & PC-8300, Olivetti M10), connected via the RS-232 port.
