= Shadow noise =

Effect that digital lightening has on an image, specifically on the darker, or shadow

Shadow noise or luminescence noise is an effect that digital lightening has on an image, specifically on the darker, or shadowed areas of the image. Brightening the image, especially in underexposed photos, brings out the "shadow noise" in such areas. Noise in digital photography is the analog to film photography's grain, or visible random variation of brightness or color that appears on an image. However, film grain tends to be less noticeable than noise, which can appear as distorted colors or artifacts on an image. A suitable analogy would be when a television begins to "snow" or experience "white noise", when static begins to appear on the screen, distorting or obscuring the image.

== Correction ==
There are methods to correct shadow noise. Professional digital editing software like Photoshop have the capability to eliminate some amount of noise, while other software, such as Band Aide or Noise Ninja are specifically designed around the process of eliminating shadow noise in a photo.
