= TI-74 =

Programmable calculator

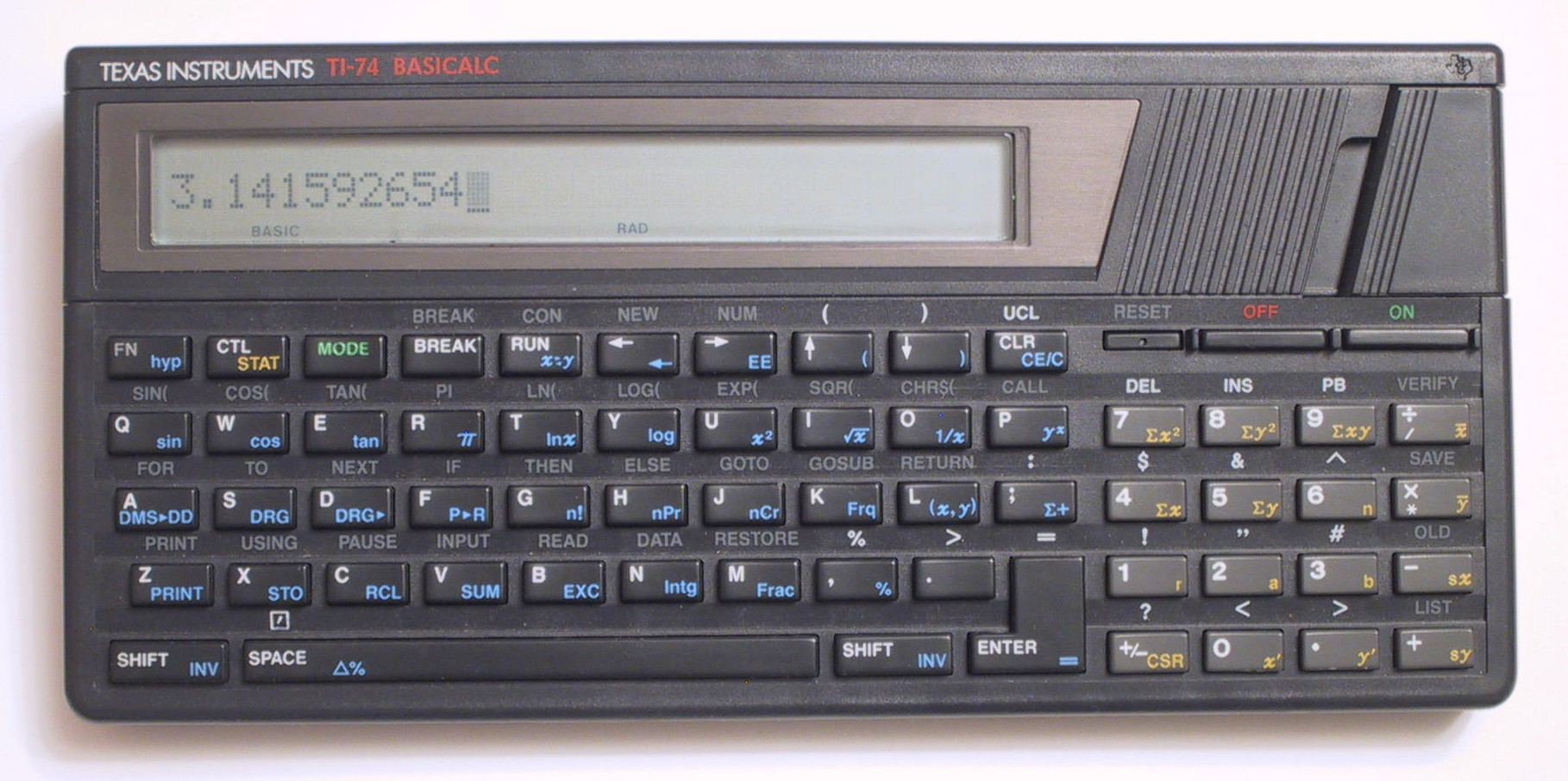
- Manufacturer: Texas Instruments
- Introduced: 1985
- Type: Pocket computer
- Processor: TMS70C46

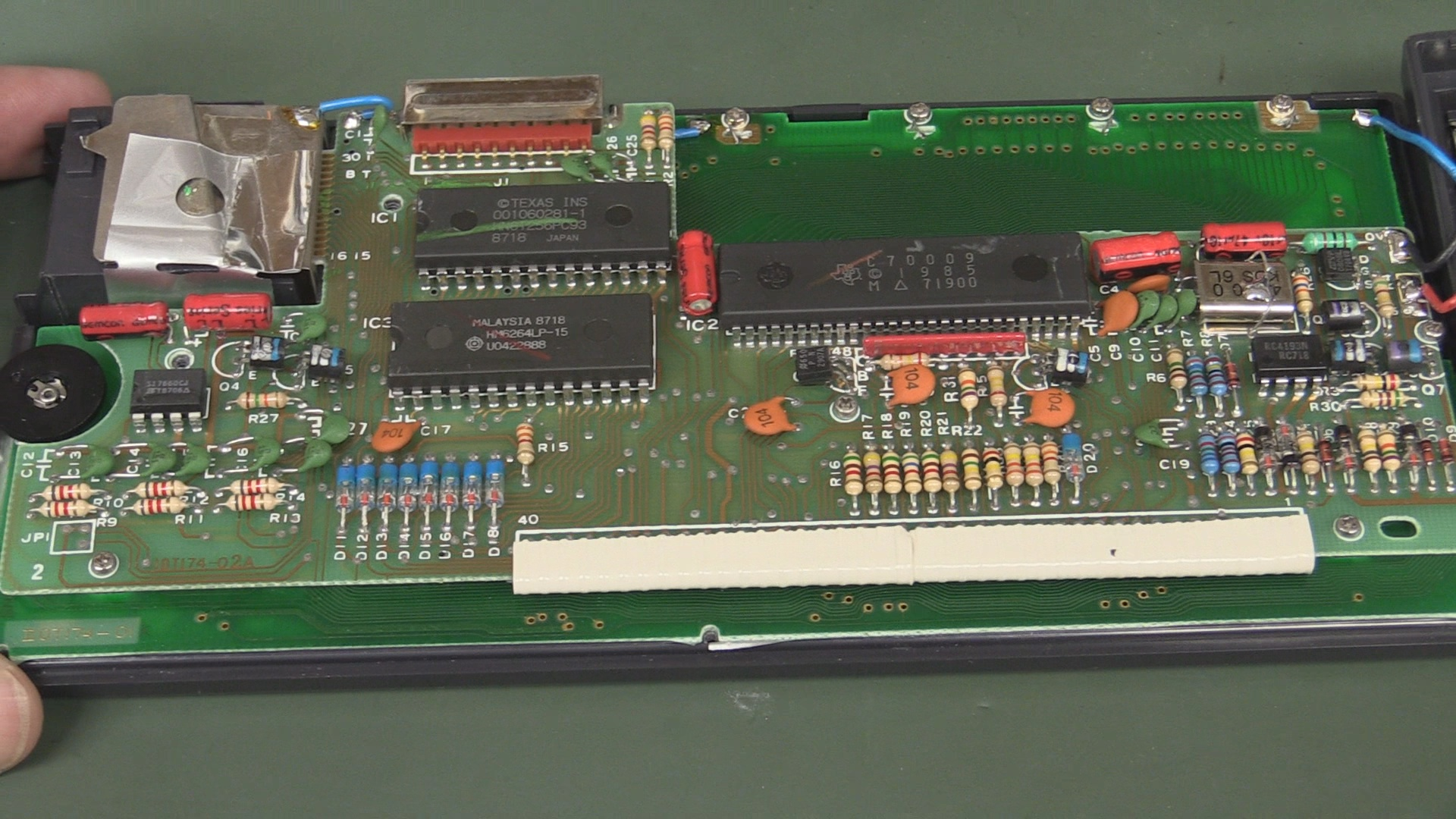
TI-74 BASIC Pocket Computer PCB

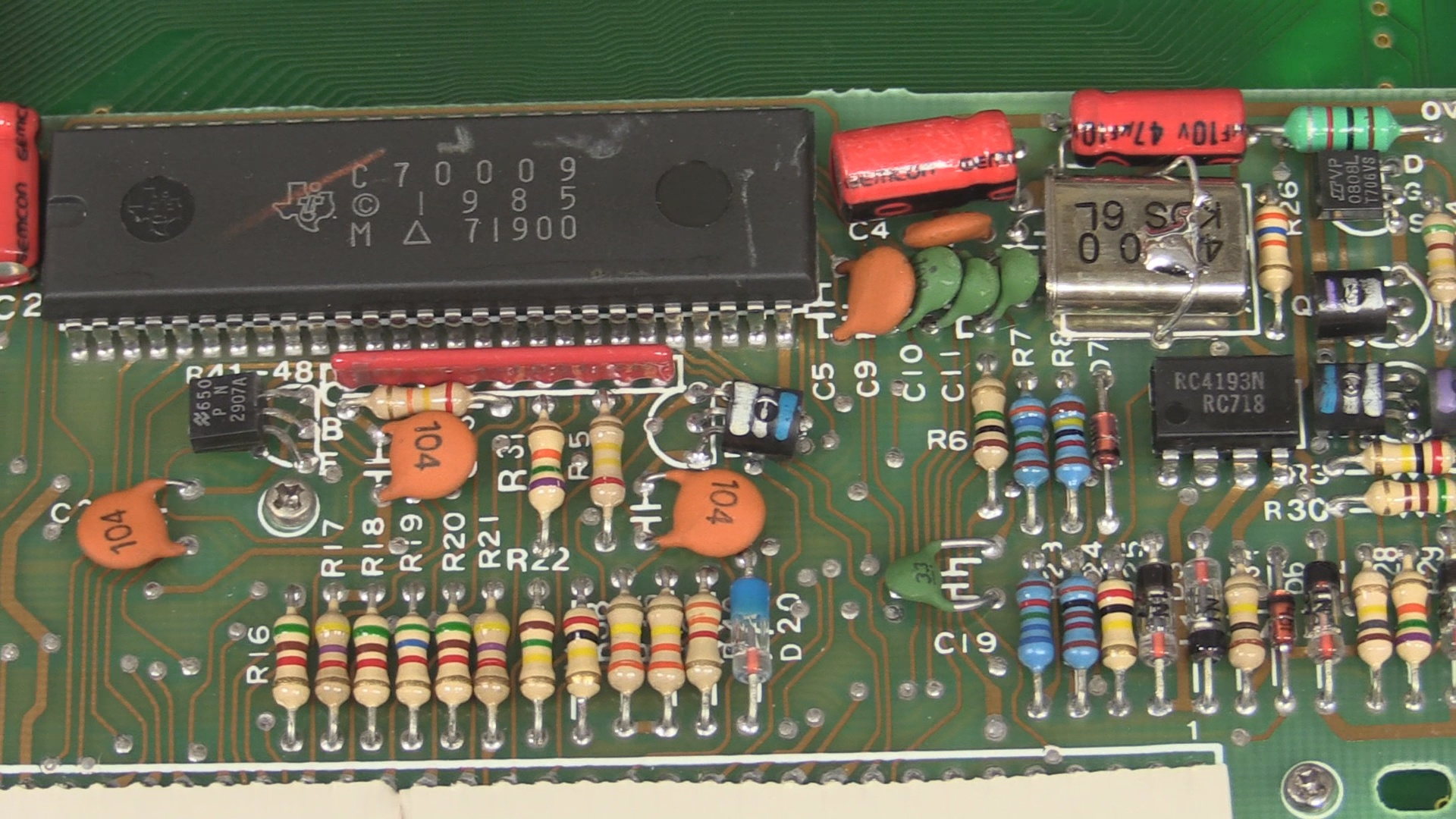
TI-74 BASIC Pocket Computer CPU

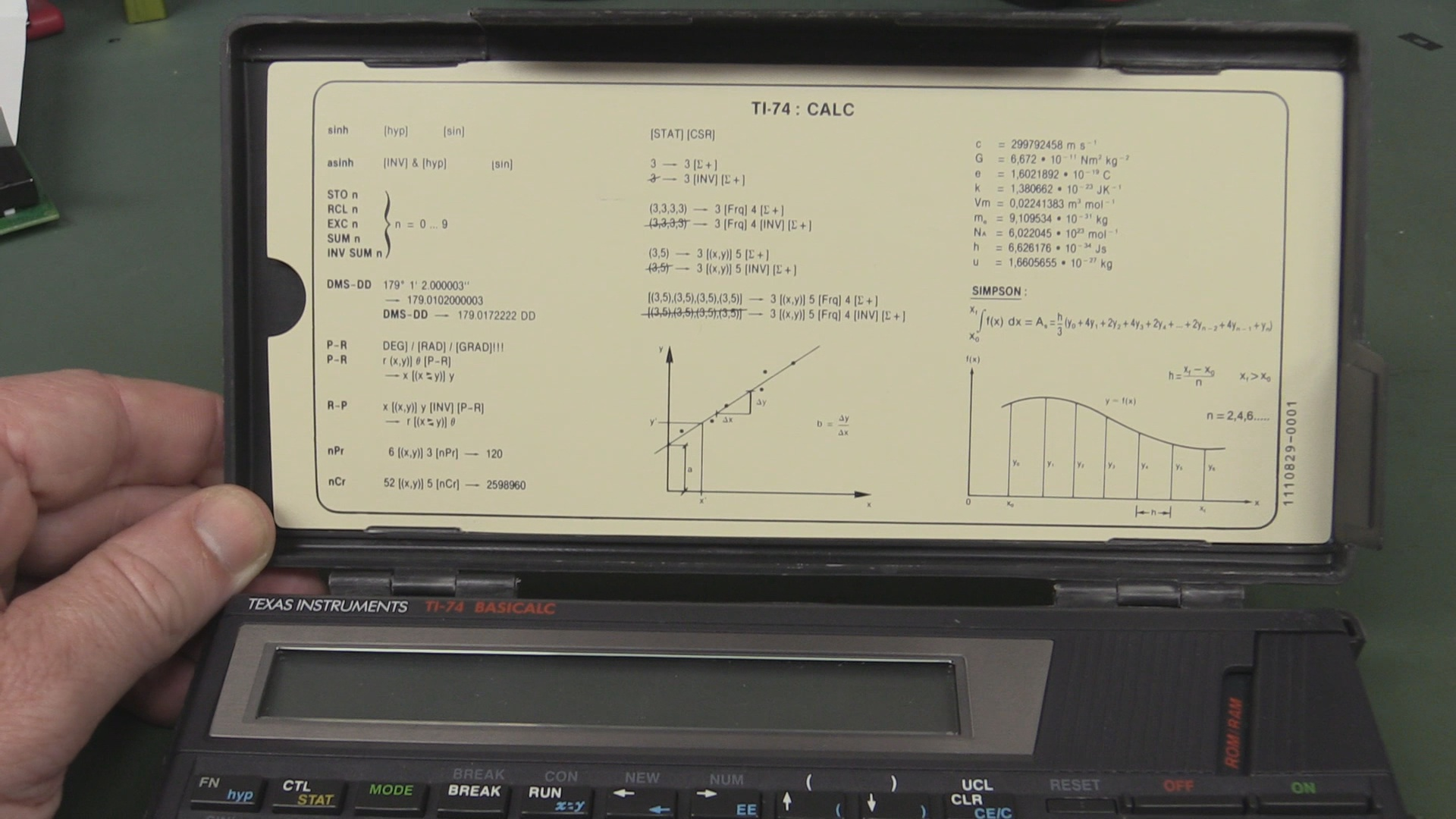
TI-74 Info Card

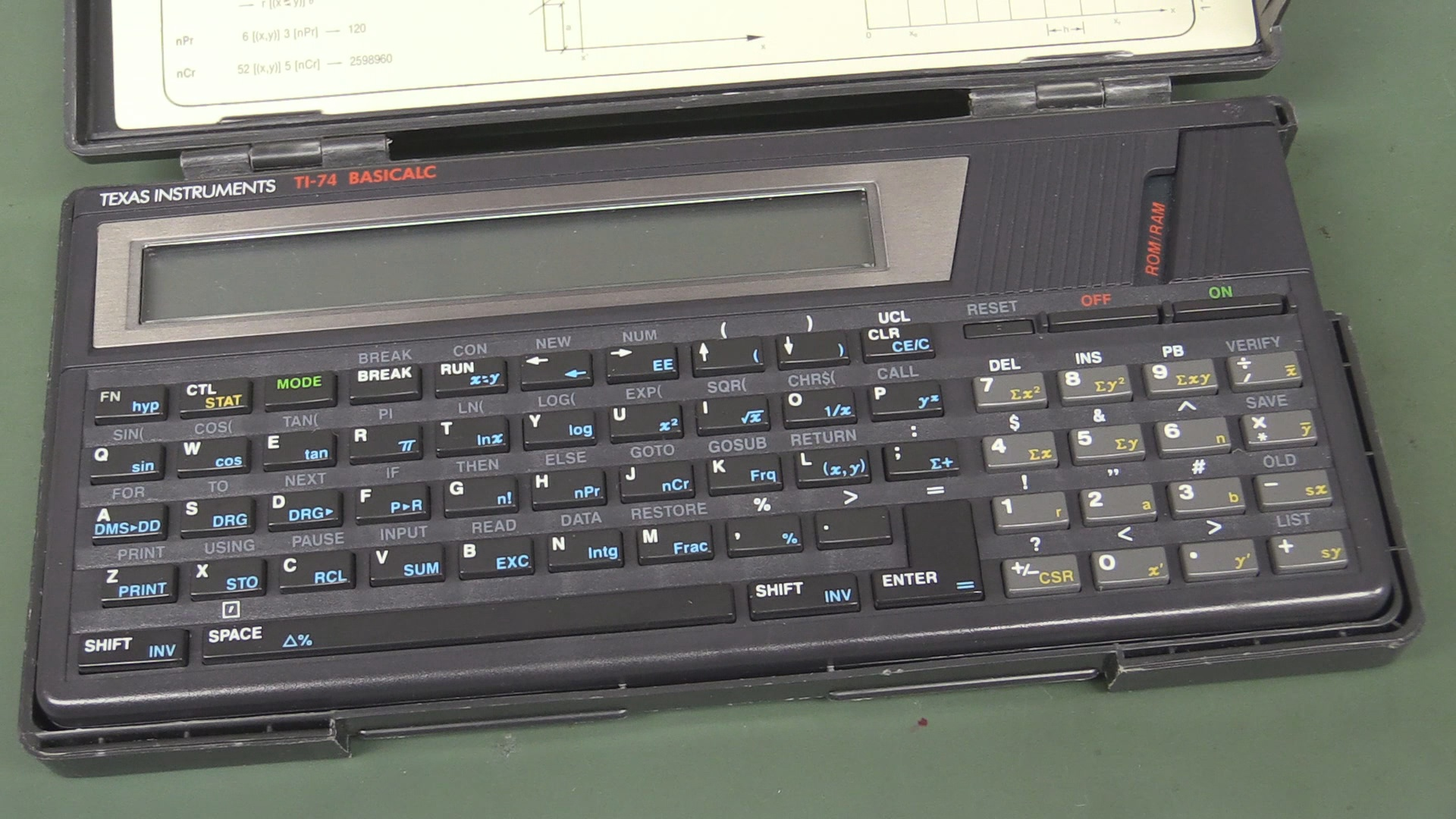
TI-74 BASIC Pocket Computer With Case

The Texas Instruments TI-74 Basicalc is a type of programmable calculator, which was released in 1985 to replace the Compact Computer 40.

The TI-74's architecture is descended from the never-released TI CC-40 Plus. TI utilized the CC-40 Plus ROM to create the TI-74's BIOS; it removed the CC-40's internal debugger to gain enough space to add calculator mode to the TI-74. The CC-40 Plus' cassette routines were reused in the TI-74, and the CC-40's Hexbus port underwent a physical footprint change and was renamed to Dockbus. The Hexbus protocol is 100% compatible between the CC-40 and TI-74 with an adapter.

One variant, the TI-74S, has a blank faceplate instead of secondary functions to allow for customization (otherwise it is the same as the 74). Both models accepted customized ROM-modules. The TI-95, released at the same time, was a keystroke programmable descendant of the TI-59 and TI-66, with the same general form factor, but a two-line display (the second line was for function key definitions).

== Technical specifications ==
- TMS70C46 CPU (C70009, another chip from TMS 7000 family also reported)
- 31 5×7 character LCD
- 32+4 KB ROM
- 8 KB RAM
- RAM/ROM memory expansion port
- Hexbus port
- 80 characters per line (31 visible)
- powered by 4 AAA-size batteries
