= TMS7000 =

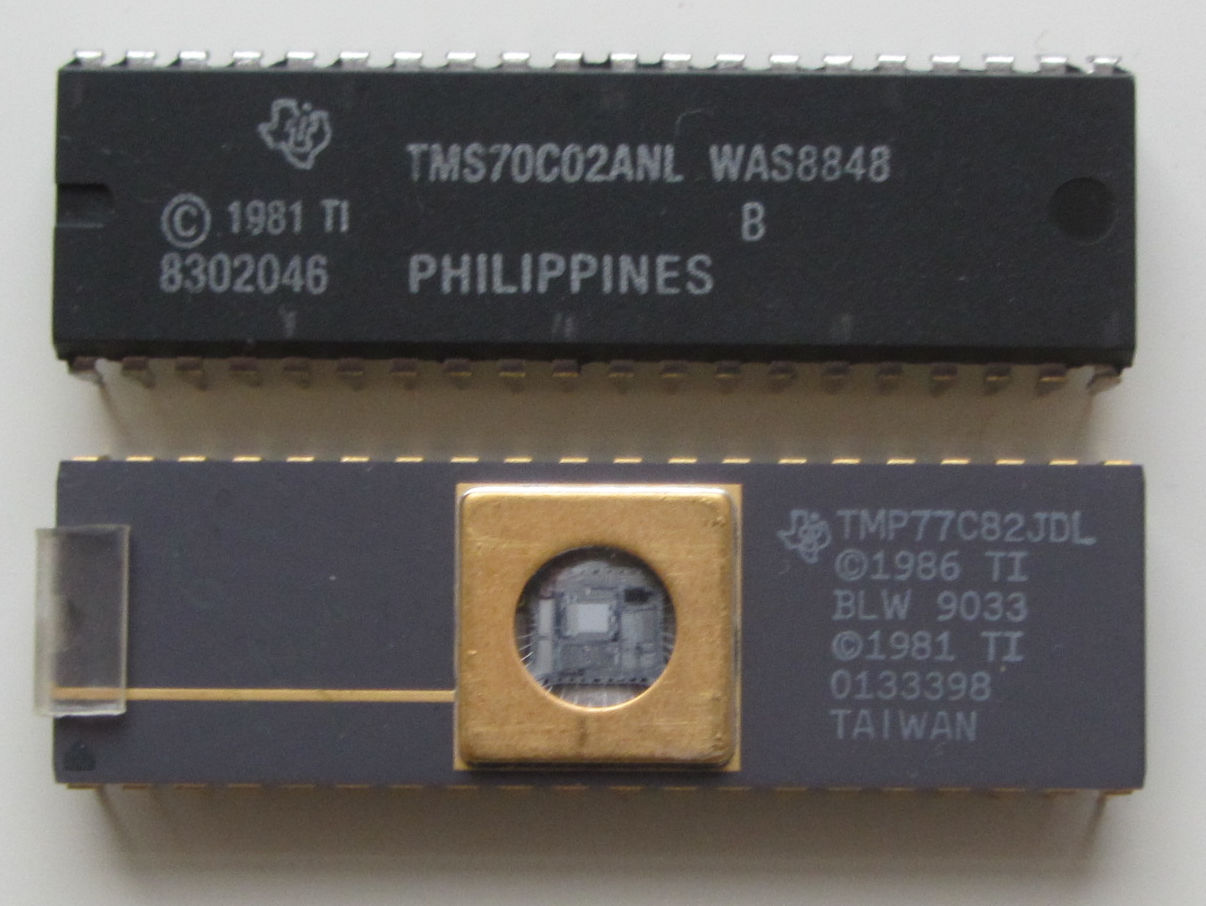
TMS7000 Family processors, plastic DIP and windowed ceramic package

The Texas Instruments TMS7000 supports 2 to 12K byte ROM, up to 256 bytes of RAM, and an option to include custom instructions: the so-called SCAT technology). This made the microcontroller interesting for cryptographic applications like early ATM-machines. The TMS7000 family was produced and marketed in the late 1980s and 1990s. It was later rebranded as the TMS370.

== Description ==
Here a text from the TMS7000 Family Data Manual:

The TMS7000 is a family of 8-bit single-chip microcontrollers. These microcontrollers incorporate a CPU, memory (ROM, RAM, EPROM), bit I/O, serial communications port, timers, interrupts, and external bus interface logic, all on a single chip. The CMOS members of the family provide an outstanding speed/power ratio as a result of the reliable silicon-gate CMOS technology.

TMS7000 registers
^{1}_{5}	^{1}_{4}	^{1}_{3}	^{1}_{2}	^{1}_{1}	^{1}_{0}	^{0}_{9}	^{0}_{8}	^{0}_{7}	^{0}_{6}	^{0}_{5}	^{0}_{4}	^{0}_{3}	^{0}_{2}	^{0}_{1}	^{0}_{0}	(bit position)
Main registers
0	0	0	0	0	0	0	0	SP								Stack pointer
PC																Program Counter
Status Register
								C	N	Z	I	Future				ST
Note: All other programmer-visible registers are allocated in the Register File (internal RAM).

Manufacturer customization is no longer available as Texas Instruments no longer produces chips in this family. What remains is a micro-controller capable of read–modify–write instructions on all registers in the peripheral memory area. The chips have 128 or 256 bytes of internal memory, of which the first two locations are mapped to CPU registers A and B, effectively a 'zero page' with faster instructions. At the start of 'page one' are the Peripheral File registers for I/O-ports, timers and the serial port. The rest of this memory page is available for external devices, which use the faster instructions. Family members were produced in NMOS and CMOS technology.

Compared to other early microcontrollers like the Motorola MC6801/6803 which were based on the generic Motorola_6800_family microprocessor, the TMS7000 family has a specific microcontroller-oriented instruction set. This is visible in fast register-oriented instructions, which applied to the 'Peripheral File' memory page (0100-01FFh) containing the internal port control registers and timers. These instructions include the read-apply-logic-mask-write instructions (ANDP, ORP, XORP) and the read-apply-mask-and-jump (BTJOP, BTJZP,...).

Another special feature of the TMS7000 family is the micro-instruction format is published. This allowed customers to create their own special instructions, which TI could integrate into custom versions of the die. This feature is called SCAT (Strip Chip Architecture Topology).

Over the time the TMS7000 family was marketed, it evolved the die technology (NMOS to CMOS), larger register file memory 128 to 256 bytes), and optimized I/O registers. The latter meant the Peripheral File changed over time, making the binary code somewhat device-dependent. This could partly be mitigated by creating a device-specific peripheral file.

The architecture could be operated in four port configurations, of which single-chip mode and microprocessor mode are the extremes. In single-chip Mode only the internal ROM and RAM are used and all ports are available for I/O, in microprocessor mode the ports C and D are used for multiplexed data and address lines. Several lines of port A are then control lines (ALE, ENABLE, R/W).

== Variations of the family ==
NMOS (+5V) 128 bytes internal RAM

- TMS7000 no on-chip ROM
- TMS7001 no on-chip ROM, hardware serial port
- TMS7020 2k byte on-chip ROM
- TMS7040 4k byte on-chip ROM
- TMS7041 4k byte on-chip ROM, hardware serial port
- TMS70120 12k byte on-chip ROM
- TMS70P161 16k byte external EPROM

NMOS 256 bytes internal RAM

- TMS7002 no on-chip ROM
- TMC7042 4k byte on-chip ROM, hardware serial port
- TMS7742 4k byte on-chip EPROM, hardware serial port

CMOS (+2.5 - +6V) 128 bytes internal RAM

- TMS70C00A no on-chip ROM
- TMS70C20A 2k byte on-chip ROM
- TMS70C40A 4k byte on-chip ROM

CMOS 256 bytes internal RAM

- TMS70C02 no on-chip ROM, improved hardware serial port
- TMS70C42 4k byte on-chip ROM, improved hardware serial port
- TMS77C82 8k byte on-chip ROM, improved hardware serial port

CMOS (+5V) 128 bytes internal RAM

- TMS70CT20 2k byte on-chip ROM
- TMS70CT40 4k byte on-chip ROM

Apart from the official versions there were custom versions with usually different labels.

== Applications ==
Applications of the TMS7000 processor family were the Texas Instruments CC-40 home computer and the TI-74 calculator.

The CTS256A-AL2 Voice Controller, a rebranded TMS7001 (as PIC7001) is used in combination with the General Instruments SPO256.

The Videocipher II encryption technology for satellite TV was implemented on a TMS7000 family processor. Videocipher II used the DES encryption algorithm.
