= Exatron =

Company

Exatron manufactures a series of automated handling, testing, programming, and marking equipment for the packaged integrated circuit industry.

== Products ==
Exatron designs, develops, manufactures, markets, and services a wide variety of I.C. component handling and testing equipment. Exatron products are used in the testing and programming of PLDs and other integrated circuits.

== Stringy Floppy and Entrepo ==
In the late 1970s and early 1980s, Exatron designed and manufactured the Exatron Stringy Floppy (ESF) tape storage device for a variety of microcomputers. Coleco also planned to use the ESF in their Colecovision Super Game Module; however, it ultimately proved to be unsuitable for the amounts and types of accesses that games inflict (the Super Game Module ended up being shelved in favor of the Adam computer, which used a different type of tape drive that Coleco developed internally).

Around this same time, Exatron announced that it was changing its name to Entrepo. From Video Games magazine, June 1983, page 49:

"Last February the Exatron Corporation changed its name to Entrepo (meaning "a storage place")."

This name change caused some people to believe that there were two manufacturers of Stringy Floppy tape drives, when in fact there were not. Note that since the company's present name is still Exatron, it is unclear if this name change never actually took place or if it was changed back at some point.

The ESF was available by mail-order through A&J Micro Drive, a related company.
