= Exatron Stringy Floppy =

Magnetic tape storage format

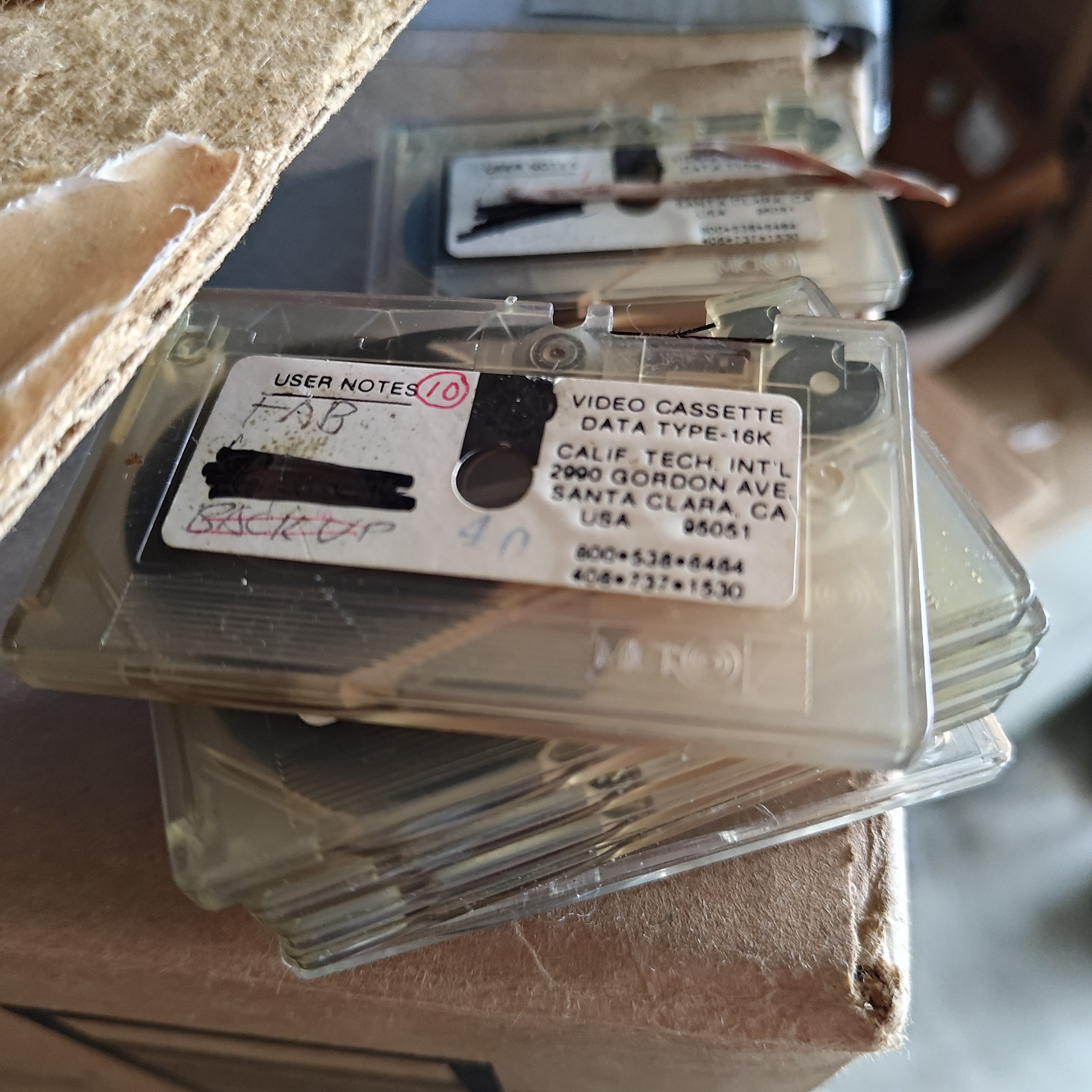
String floppy cassette from the mid 1980s made by California Technology International

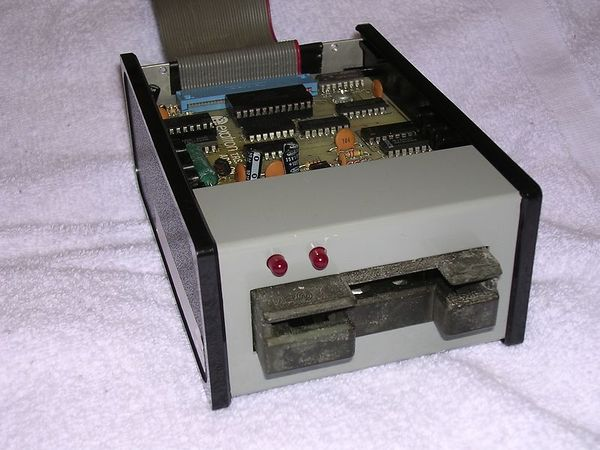
An Exatron Stringy Floppy (cover removed) designed for use with the TRS-80 Model 1

The Exatron Stringy Floppy (or ESF) was a continuous-loop tape drive developed by Exatron in 1978 for home computer users. The format was one of many attempts made by manufacturers to develop a new data cassette format that was smaller and more data dense than traditional data cassettes. The like other data tape formats, the ESF wafer system failed to catch on as a removable media due to a number of competing formats and inherent speed issue with tape storage, and was eventually abandoned as the cost of floppy disk storage dropped in the 1980s. (Note: An add-on 8" disk drive cost $669 in November 1980) (Note: An add-on external 5.25 inch floppy drive cost $207 in February of 1990)

== History ==
By the late 1970s computer hobbyists and manufacturers had begun to look for alternatives methods of data storage for home computers. The two main data storage formats for home use in 1978 were floppy disk or data cassette (repurposed audio cassette tapes and recorders). The 5 1/4-inch floppy was not introduced until 1976 and the more rigid 3 1/2-inch version did not appear until 1983. Floppy disks offered quick read and write times, random-access, but there was a high cost of entry for drives. Data cassettes were significantly slower and only offered sequential access to data, but the entry cost was extremely low.

Like other companies, Exatron developed a proprietary digital cassette to offer a compromise between the two formats. The company introduced the Exatron stringy floppy drive (ESF) and accompanying "wafers" at the 1978 West Coast Computer Faire, and a "ESF-80" version for the Radio Shack TRS-80 in 1979. ESF wafers allowed for higher write speeds (7200 baud for Model 1000 wafers, and 11400 baud for Model 2000) than a traditional audio cassette recorder (250 - 500 baud), but did not provide random access. Data on tape needs to be accessed sequentially, that is, the tape must be wound to the appropriate position before data can be read or written.

Exatron sold about 4,000 ESF-80 drives by August 1981, at an MSRP of $249.50. Exatron eventually began to produce only their "Model 2000" tape, which moved at twice the speed of a Model 1000 mode. These formats were not compatible. In July 1983, the VIC-20 and C64 model (ESF-20/64) MSRP was $199.50. Exatron rebranded as "Entrepo" in 1983. The ESF was sold via mail order into 1986 by A&J Microdrive.

== Technical information and limitations ==
The Exatron system used a continuous-loop (similar to an 8-track cartridge) which moved in a single direction. The wafers used a photocell and indicator to designate the start of the tape loop. The wafers were almost the size of an American business card (about 3/16 inch (4.8 mm) thick and 1/16 inch (1.6 mm) wide). Loop systems were considered advantageous since they did not need to be rewound like a traditional magnetic audio or video tape (although they did need to advance through the remainder of the tape length to access files located at earlier memory addresses). On a traditional data cassette of the era, the user would need to manually rewind the tape into the correct position.

Like all data cassette formats of the era, there is no digital single catalog of files. To load a specific file, the drive must scan the tape loop, briefly stopping to read the header of each file. Since the tape loop only moves in one direction, a file that starts behind the current location cannot be read until the read head moves over that spot on the tape. One complete cycle through a 16kB wafer takes 55 to 65 seconds, depending on the number of files it contains.

Unlike later formats, the ESF system did not automatically prevent or remind a user when they were about to write-over existing data. Users had to use a command to verify the section of tape they planned to write to was empty (or unwanted) before transferring data to a wafer.

Wafers were available in tape lengths ranging from 5 to 75 feet (1.5 to 22.9 m).

Model 1000 Tape Capacities
Kilobtyes	Length (feet)	Length (meters)
4 kB	5 feet	1.5 m
16 kB	20 feet	6.1 m
48 kB	50 feet	15.25 m
64 kB	75 feet	22.9 m

Model 2000 information
Length (ft)	Length (m)	Kilobtyes	Read time
10 feet	3 meters	14 kB	12 seconds
20 feet	6.1 meters	28 kB	24 seconds
35 feet	10.7 meters	49 kB	42 seconds
50 feet	15.2 meters	70 kB	60 seconds
62 feet	18.9 meters	85 kB	73 seconds

== Usage and reaction ==
Exatron first demonstrated the S-100 bus version of the Stringy Floppy at the West Coast Computer Faire (held in San Francisco) in March 1978. Support for the TRS-80 Model I was announced in May 1979 at the San Francisco Computer Faire.

In the July 1983 issue of Compute!'s Gazette, the Exatron Stringy Floppy (ESF) for the VIC-20 and the Commodore 64 was described as a faster alternative to traditional data cassettes, and its ability to out-perform some lower quality hard disks. The main issue highlighted was the lack of software available for purchase on wafers.

According to Embedded Systems magazine, the Exatron Stringy Floppy uses Manchester encoding, achieving 14K read-write speeds and the code controlling the device was developed by Li-Chen Wang.

Texas Instruments licensed the ESF for its cancelled TI 99/2 computer and a Compact Computer 40 peripheral which never shipped. Exatron hoped to develop Apple II and Commodore PET models. Models were available for the Timex Sinclair, including the 2068, the ZX80 and the ZX81

An investigation by the Naval Postgraduate School in 1981 described the ESF-80 version of the string floppy as a quicker alternative to a cassette drive but noted the significant delays when compared to an 8" or 5.25" floppy.

The Exatron drive was initially used in the Prophet-10 music synthesizer and was later replaced with a micro-cassette drive from Braemar, reportedly due to unreliability and poor mutual compatibility of the former.

== See also ==
- Data cassette
- Rotronics Wafadrive
- ZX Microdrive
- Linear Tape-Open
