= EMVA1288 =

Electronic measurement standard

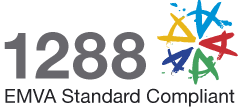
EMVA1288 compliant logo

EMVA1288 is an electronic measurement standard developed by the European Machine Vision Association (EMVA). Its purpose is to define the methods to measure and characterize image sensors and cameras that are used in machine vision. It also provides rules and guidelines on how to report results and how to write device datasheets.

The main goal of the standard is to characterize industrial cameras. Therefore, photography and television standards are not applicable. It was necessary to define a new standard specific to machine vision applications.

The standard is free to use and free to download but the user must register to EMVA to have the right to use the "EMVA1288 compliant" logo on their publications or products.

== History ==
Work on the 1288 standard started in 2004. Release 1 for monochrome cameras was released in August 2005. In Release A2.01, issued in August 2007 included an additional linearity module. With Release 3, published in November 2010 the first version was available that covered monochrome and color cameras as well as area and line cameras together with a characterization of defect pixels. Release 3.1 came into effect on December 30, 2016. This release contains only a few refinements and additions. Its major new feature is a standardized summary datasheet making camera comparison even easier. The most important refinement is a definition of the camera signal nonlinearity better adapted to cameras with a higher dynamic range. The only two other major additions are: a) the total SNR curve which includes the spatial nonuniformities, and b) diagrams of horizontal and vertical profiles for a meaningful and well-arranged characterization of the different types of the spatial nonuniformities.

The standardization committee was chaired by Martin Wäny from Awaiba until 2007. Since 2008 the chair is Bernd Jähne, HCI, Heidelberg University.

== Principles ==
=== Main principles ===
The standard only uses radiometric units like watts, joules, number of photons, volts, etc. There is no use of photometric units like lux.

The 1288 standard is based on a linear camera model. All noise sources except for photon noise and quantization noise can be included into a single parameter, the variance of the dark noise. Thus the model contains only three basic unknowns: the quantum efficiency, the dark noise and the system gain.

=== Response method ===
The response is a plot of the camera's output (in digital numbers) versus the impinging light (as amount of photons). The slope of this plot is the response of the camera. The deviation from an ideal straight line is a measurement of the non-linearity of the camera.

=== Photon transfer method ===
The photon transfer is a plot of the variance of the camera's output (in digital numbers squared) versus the output of the camera for the same amount of impinging photons (in digital numbers). The maximum of this curve defines the saturation capacity. The leftmost point defines the dark noise and the slope defines the noise caused by the light itself.

== Summary data sheet ==
The summary data sheet contains three major elements:

=== Operating point ===
Contains a complete description of the settings of the operating point at which the EMVA 1288 measurements have been acquired. Settings not specified are assumed to be in the factory default mode. This ensures that the measurements can be repeated anytime under the same conditions.

=== Photon Transfer Curve and SNR Curve ===
The photon transfer curve shows the variance of the image sensor noise versus the mean value. For an ideal linear camera this curve should be linear. Only if the lower 70% of the curve are linear, can the EMVA 1288 performance parameters be estimated accurately. If a camera has any type of deficiencies, these can often first seen in the photon transfer curve. The double-logarithmic SNR curve [2b] is a nice overall graphical representation of all camera performance parameters except for the dark current. The absolute sensitivity threshold is marked as well as the saturation capacity. In addition, the maximum signal-to-noise ratio and the dynamic range can be read from the graph. The total SNR is plotted as a dashed line. It includes both the variances from the temporal noise and the nonuniformities. If this line lies recognizably below the solid line of the SNR curve, nonuniformities significantly reduce the performance of the camera.

=== EMVA 1288 Performance Parameters ===
This column lists all EMVA 1288 performance parameters.

== EMVA1288 Compliance ==
If EMVA standard 1288 compliant data are published or provided to a customer or any third party the full data sheet must be provided. An EMVA 1288 compliant data sheet must contain all mandatory measurements and graphs as specified in the standard document for release 3.1

== Related documents ==
- Glossary of machine vision
