= TI-95 =

Programmable calculator produced by Texas Instruments

TI-95 PROCALC
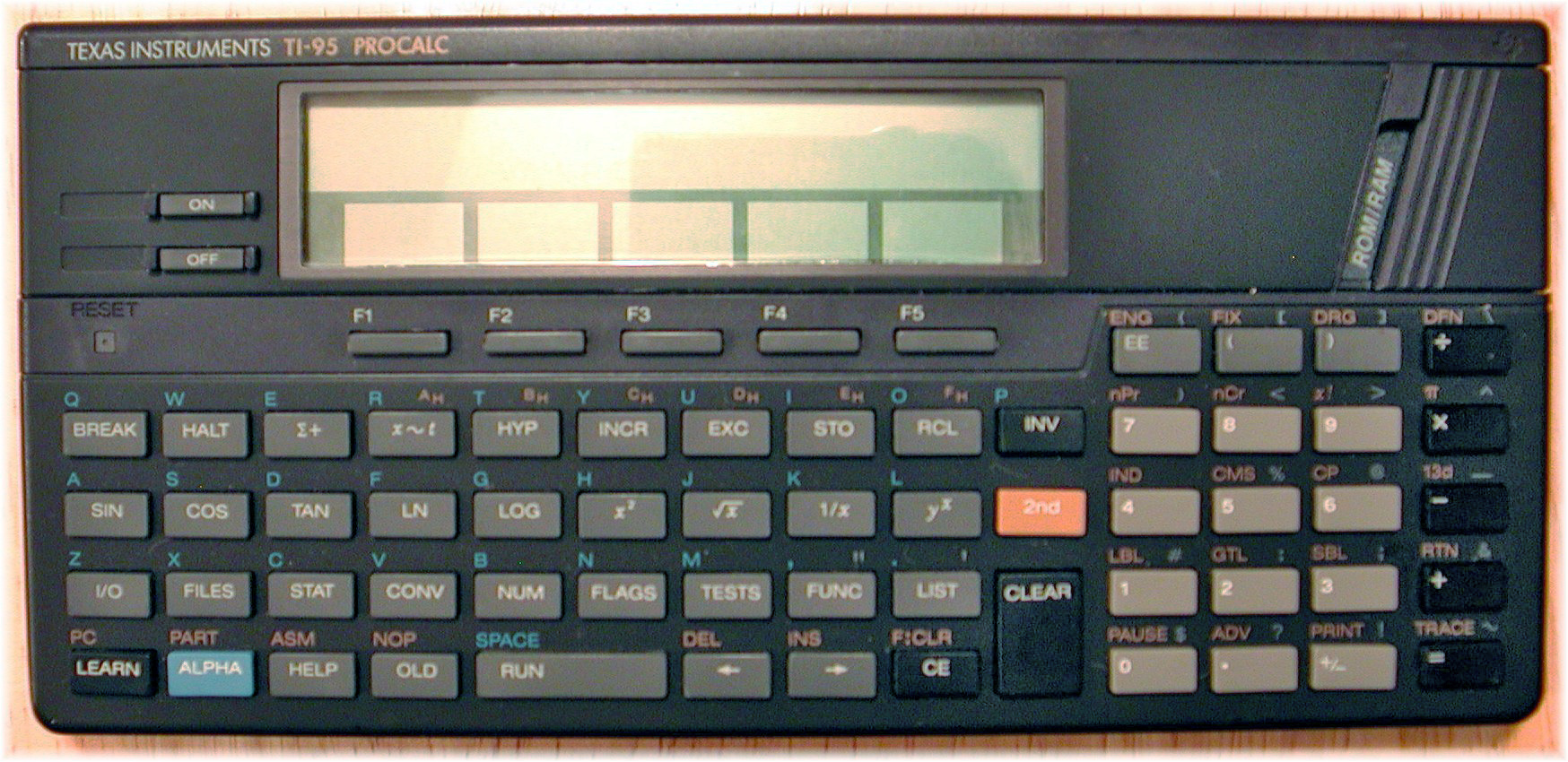
- Manufacturer: Texas Instruments
- Introduced: 1986
- Type: Pocket computer
- Processor: TMS70C46
- Memory: 8 kb
- Dimensions: 3.7" x 8" x 1"

The TI-95, also called the TI-95 PROCALC, is a keystroke-programmable calculator and was introduced in 1987 by Texas Instruments. It was rather large, measuring 3.7 inches by 8 inches by 1 inch and had a 16-character alphanumeric display for the main display, and a set of five 3-character displays for use as menu items. It had 8 kB of onboard RAM, capable of being partitioned by the user between program steps for the built-in program editor, numerically labelled registers, and file memory. It could also be connected to PC-324-compatible printers. The calculator came with a hard carrying case which closes around it. Compatible ROM and extra RAM could be placed in the expansion slot in the upper right corner of the device, which came from the factory with a dummy protector cartridge labelled "ROM/RAM". Texas Instruments would release three compatible ROM cartridges, one containing advanced mathematics functions such as the Gamma function and Newton's method labeled Mathematics, a second containing statistics features such as the normal and Student's t distributions and various statistical tests labeled Statistics, and a third containing functions and data on common industrial chemicals labelled as Chemical Engineering. An 8 kb RAM expansion cartridge could also be placed into the cartridge slot, and RAM cartridges could be given names to allow a user to have multiple cartridges, each with its own library of custom-made functions. The calculator also supported the use of a cassette tape drive to store programs. Programs are entered into the calculator's memory as a keystroke program, in which the user effectively records a macro which is played back when the program is run.
