= Signal chain =

Series of signal-conditioning components

Signal chain, or signal-processing chain is a term used in signal processing and mixed-signal system design to describe a series of signal-conditioning electronic components that receive input (data acquired from sampling either real-time phenomena or from stored data) sequentially, with the output of one portion of the chain supplying input to the next.

Signal chains are often used in signal processing applications to gather and process data or to apply system controls based on analysis of real-time phenomena.

== Definition ==
This definition comes from common usage in the electronics industry and can be derived from definitions of its parts:

- Signal: "The event, phenomenon, or electrical quantity, that conveys information from one point to another".
- Chain: "1. Any series of items linked together. 2. Pertaining to a routine consisting of segments which are run through the computer in tandem, only one segment being within the computer at any one time and each segment using the output from the previous program as its input".

The concept of a signal chain is familiar to electrical engineers, but the term has many synonyms such as circuit topology. The goal of any signal chain is to process a variety of signals to monitor or control an analog-, digital-, or analog-digital system.

== See also ==
- Audio signal flow
- Daisy chain (electrical engineering)
- Feedback
