= Compact Computer 40 =

1983 portable computer from Texas Instruments

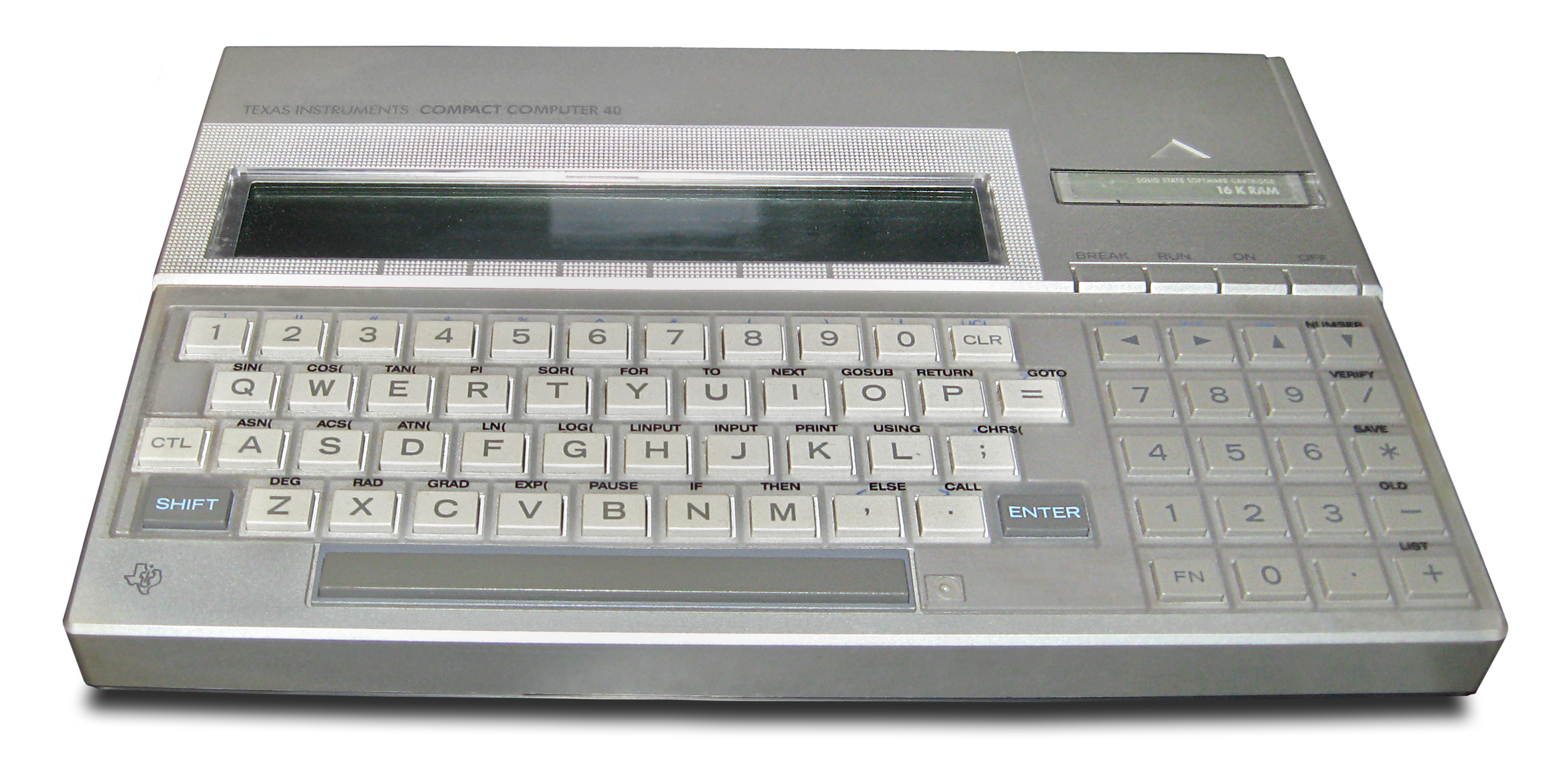
- Developer: Texas Instruments
- Manufacturer: Texas Instruments
- Type: Notebook computer
- Released: March 1983
- Introductory price: US$249 (equivalent to $804.9 in 2025)
- CPU: TMS70C20 @ 2.5 MHz
- Memory: 6 KB

The Compact Computer 40, or CC-40, is a notebook-sized computer developed by Texas Instruments. It started development in 1981, and was released in March 1983 for US$249. The CC-40 has a single-line 31 character LCD, weighs 600 grams (21 ounces) and is powered by an AC adapter or can operate for 200 hours on four AA batteries. Memory is not erased by turning the unit off; it can retain data for several months. The CC-40 lacks a way to store data more permanently. Software was only available on cartridge or by typing programs into its built-in BASIC interpreter. The BASIC interpreter is similar but not identical to that of the TI-99/4A.

The CC-40 uses TI's TMS70C20 CPU, an 8-bit microprocessor that runs at 2.5 MHz. The system has 6 kilobytes of random-access memory (RAM; expandable to 18 KB), and 34 KB of read-only memory (ROM). Peripherals can be connected via a Hexbus port: an 80 column printer, printer/plotter, RS-232 interface, and modem. A licensed version of the Exatron Stringy Floppy as a digital "Wafertape" unit depicted on the computer's box was only released as a prototype, reportedly because it proved too unreliable.

== Development ==
The Compact Computer 40 was developed under the internal codename "Lonestar". "We believe this is a solutions machine [for] 30 million professionals and college students", a TI executive said in mid-1983.

== Reception ==
BYTE heavily criticized the CC-40, noting that "there's no clock. No file system. Only one BASIC program at a time can reside in memory, and the user can only work with about 5200 bytes of that. And the keyboard is vile". It also noted the lack of any external storage because the TI Wafertape drive was not available, and the complete lack of software. The review suggested that the computer should be considered a "dandy scientific calculator" since good programmable calculators cost about the same as the CC-40's $250 price, but that otherwise "virtually all of its competition vastly outstrips it in power and features", including the $99 TI-99/4A.

In a review for Creative Computing, Joe Devlin wrote, "The permanent memory and powerful Basic exceed the capabilities found in most hand-held computers." He recommended it as a convenient tool for learning BASIC or for someone who frequently does calculations with formulas.

In 1983, MicroKids magazine included the CC-40 on a list of "Top 10 Great Gift Ideas".

== Legacy and Planned Software/Hardware ==
Compact Computer 70 mock-up

=== Planned hardware ===
TI planned to license the Exatron Stringy Floppy as the Wafertape

=== Planned software ===
According to TI Engineer Stephen Reid, these are the software titles that would have been released for the CC-40 had the Hexbus Wafertape drive been reliable and released. Each program (or combination of programs) would have been available to be purchased on Wafertape at a retail outlet.

All code to the below programs was authored and finalized. These programs are archived at Texas Instruments, and some documentation is also written. The programs were never released to the public due to the failure of the Hexbus Wafertape drive.

Wafertape Library for the CC-40
Control Charts	Dynamics	Electrical Engineering	Extras	Inventory (control and management)	Non Parametric Stat	PDraw (pen plotter drawing)	Photo (darkroom and film exposure/processing)
PCHART	CIRCLE	AMP	CONVERSN	EOQ	CHISQR	CEDIT	BW
P OR NP	COLLIDE	BIPOLE	KNMATIC1	LATE	COCHRAN	EDIT	COLOR
RANGE	INERTIA	COIL	KNMATIC2	OVHD	FRIEDMAN	PERTRAN	DEPTH
STDDV	LINEAR	DELTA	ORBIT	PGMT	GAUSS	PLOTTERS	EXTUBE
UCHART	PROJ	FIELD		RT	KRUSWALL	TDEE	FLASH
U OR C	ROTATE	LDFLOW		SUM	RANK	TIMED	LRATIO
	SHM	POWER		TOTAL	RANKSUB		SLENS
	VECTOR	RADIAL			RUNS
		VOLT			RXC
					TAU
					TOLLIM
Pipe (Flow, etc)	ProdPlan (production planning)	Profit	Regression	Samples	Solar	Thermodynamics	WaferTape Utiliities (Note: This was for building cartridge images, etc. These were mostly ram-loadable assembly utilities.)
DWE	BAL	ATCF	ADV	AOQL	FCHART	BDPOINT	CARTDIR
EPM	BREAK	IRRA	AUTO	CONT	GAIN	FLOW	CARTINIT
GLPS	CAP	IRRB	CHECK	DES	HEAT	HEATCAP	CARTLOAD
HCM	CP	MDS	CORR	SAM	HEATEXC	PENG	CARTSAVE
HTC	CV	NPVA	CORR2	UNIT	HTC	PSY	CARTSAVX
HTIP	RATES	NPVB	CUBIC	VARI	SOLECO	REACT	DIR
HWF	TIME		EXP		ZENITH	SRK	FILECOPY
WPD	TV		MLT			STEAM	PROG
			MLT2				SUBPROG
			NL				TAPECOPY
			WAFER (utility)

=== Planned Hardware ===
The Hex-Bus interface was also available for the TI-99/4A as an unreleased prototype expansion peripheral. It was built into the prototypes of the cancelled TI-99/2 and TI-99/8 computers.

An improved model, the CC-40 Plus, was in the final stages of development and included a cassette port. The project was canceled when Texas Instruments discontinued the 99/4A and exited the home computer market. Most of the architecture of the CC-40 Plus was reused in the Texas Instruments TI-74. The TI-74 changed the physical footprint of the Hexbus port and rename it Dockbus. Old Hexbus peripherals could even be used on the TI-74 with an adapter.

Also in development was the Compact Computer 70 (codenamed "Superstar"). The CC-70 was to have four cartridge ports, more RAM, and an 8 x 80 display with graphics capability. The CC-70 mock-up from Calculator division lead CB Wilson showed up on eBay in 2020. Engineer Steven Reid has stated that the first run of chips for the CC-70 failed, and TI discontinued the Home Computer division in October 1983 before the chip issues could be corrected.
