= Dark current (physics) =

Weak electric current generated by photosensitive devices in pure darkness

In physics and in electronic engineering, dark current is the relatively small electric current that flows through photosensitive devices such as a photomultiplier tube, photodiode, or charge-coupled device even when no photons enter the device; it consists of the charges generated in the detector when no outside radiation is entering the detector. It is referred to as reverse bias leakage current in non-optical devices and is present in all diodes. Physically, dark current is due to the random generation of electrons and holes within the depletion region of the device.

Dark current is one of the main sources for noise in image sensors such as charge-coupled devices. The pattern of different dark currents can result in a fixed-pattern noise; dark frame subtraction can remove an estimate of the mean fixed pattern, but there still remains a temporal noise, because the dark current itself has a shot noise.

== Chemistry ==
In analytical chemistry, dark current refers to the constant response produced by a photodetector, even in the absence of radiation. The nonzero response can be due to the random thermal excitation of electrons in the detector, which is brought up to measurable levels by amplification. This response adds to the signal produced when the receptor is used to measure light and so must be dealt with to determine how much of the detector response is actually due to the radiation. To compensate for this extra signal, the dark current may be measured in the absence of radiation and then subtracted from the final signal or reduced to zero by a compensating circuit. This is often referred to as "blanking" and is a form of blank correction.
