= Fixed-pattern noise =

Noise pattern on digital imaging sensors

Fixed-pattern noise (FPN) is the term given to a particular noise pattern on digital imaging sensors often noticeable during longer exposure shots where particular pixels are susceptible to giving brighter intensities above the average intensity.

== Overview ==
FPN is a general term that identifies a temporally constant lateral non-uniformity (forming a constant pattern) in an imaging system with multiple detector or picture elements (pixels). It is characterised by the same pattern of variation in pixel-brightness occurring in images taken under the same illumination conditions in an imaging array. This problem arises from small differences in the individual responsitivity of the sensor array (including any local postamplification stages) that might be caused by variations in the pixel size, material or interference with the local circuitry. It might be affected by changes in the environment like different temperatures, exposure times, etc.

The term "fixed pattern noise" usually refers to two parameters. One is the dark signal non-uniformity (DSNU), which is the offset from the average across the imaging array at a particular setting (temperature, integration time) but no external illumination and the photo response non-uniformity (PRNU), which describes the gain or ratio between optical power on a pixel versus the electrical signal output. The latter is often simplified as a single value measured at e.g. 50% saturation level, implying a linear approximation of the not perfectly linear photo response non-linearity (PRNL). Often PRNU as defined above is subdivided in pure "(offset) FPN" which is the part not dependent on temperature and integration time, and the integration time and temperature dependent "DSNU".

Sometimes pixel noise as the average deviation from the array average under different illumination and temperature conditions is specified. Pixel noise therefore gives a number (commonly expressed in rms) that identifies FPN in all permitted imaging conditions, which might strongly deteriorate if additional electrical gain (and noise) is included. Recent uses for PRNU include measures to fighting motion picture piracy.

In practice, a long exposure (integration time) emphasizes the inherent differences in pixel response so they may become a visible defect, degrading the image. Although FPN does not change appreciably across a series of captures, it may vary with integration time, imager temperature, imager gain and incident illumination. It is not expressed in a random (uncorrelated or changing) spatial distribution, occurring only at certain, fixed pixel locations.

== Suppression of FPN ==
FPN is commonly suppressed by flat-field correction (FFC) that uses DSNU and PRNU to linearly interpolate and reduce the local photo response (non-uniform PRNL) to the array average. Hence, two exposures with an equal illumination across the array are necessary (one without light and one close to saturation) to obtain the values. Note that this correction usually is very sensitive to modifications of the system parameters (i.e., exposure time, temperature). The main challenge is to generate a flat-field illumination for short time exposures and wavelengths, to avoid speckle (in monochromatic light conditions) and statistical fluctuations of the light stream that become most obvious at short integration times.

Many patents and methods exist to reduce or eliminate fixed-pattern noise in digital imagers. Specific for the suppression of "offset FPN" as defined above, on-chip techniques for suppression exist, such as correlated double sampling.

== See also ==
- Flat-field correction
