= Index of physics articles (J) =

The index of physics articles is split into multiple pages due to its size.

To navigate by individual letter use the table of contents below.

== J ==
- J-PARC
- J-coupling
- J.D. Jackson
- J. A. Ratcliffe
- J. B. Gunn
- J. Clarence Karcher
- J. David Jackson
- J. Doyne Farmer
- J. Hans D. Jensen
- J. J. Sakurai
- J. J. Thomson
- J. Kim Vandiver
- J. Korean Phys. Soc.
- J. Lamar Worzel
- J. Lightwave Tech.
- J. M. R. Parrondo
- J. M. Robson
- J. Richard Fisher
- J. Richard Gott
- J. Robert Oppenheimer
- J/ψ meson
- J0651
- J1 J2 model
- JADE (particle detector)
- JAMIC
- JILA
- JT-60
- J D Jackson
- Jaan Einasto
- Jablonski diagram
- Jack Cover
- Jack Goldman
- Jack Kilby
- Jack Sarfatti
- Jack Sound
- Jack Steinberger
- Jacketed vessel
- Jacob Bekenstein
- Jacob Leupold
- Jacob Metius
- Jacobi coordinates
- Jacqueline Priestman
- Jacques-Arsène d'Arsonval
- Jacques Babinet
- Jacques Beaulieu
- Jacques Cassini
- Jacques Charles
- Jacques Curie
- Jacques Distler
- Jacques Lewiner
- Jacques Prost
- Jacques Rohault
- Jacques Villain
- Jae R. Ballif
- Jagadeesh Moodera
- Jagadish Chandra Bose
- Jaguar (software)
- Jahn–Teller effect
- Jainendra K. Jain
- Jakob Ackeret
- Jakob Laub
- Jamal Nazrul Islam
- James A. Isenberg
- James A. Yorke
- James Alfred Ewing
- James Arthur Pollock
- James Atkinson (physicist)
- James Ayscough
- James B. Macelwane
- James B. Pollack
- James Binney
- James Bjorken
- James C. Keck
- James Chadwick
- James Challis
- James Clerk Maxwell
- James Cronin
- James D. Watson
- James David Forbes
- James Dewar
- James E. Boyd (scientist)
- James E. Faller
- James E. McDonald
- James E. Muller
- James E. Pringle
- James Franck
- James Gilbert Baker
- James Glimm
- James H. Stith
- James H. Trainor
- James Hansen
- James Hartle
- James Hillier
- James Hough
- James J. Kay
- James Kakalios
- James L. Tuck
- James Lighthill
- James Loudon
- James M. Bardeen
- James N. Hallock
- James P. C. Southall
- James Prescott Joule
- James Rainwater
- James Short (mathematician)
- James Trefil
- James Van Allen
- James W. LaBelle
- James W. York
- Jamin interferometer
- Jamming (physics)
- Jan Ambjørn
- Jan Burgers
- Jan D. Achenbach
- Jan Ingenhousz
- Jan Kazimierz Danysz
- Jan Smit (physicist)
- Jan Sładkowski
- Jan Zaanen
- Jan Zawidzki
- Jan Łopuszański (physicist)
- Jane English
- Janet S. Fender
- Janez Strnad
- Janna Levin
- Jansky
- Jansky noise
- Janus laser
- Janus particles
- Janusz Andrzej Zakrzewski
- Janwillem van den Berg
- Japan Society for Composite Materials
- Japan Society of Applied Physics
- Japanese Journal of Applied Physics
- Jaroslav Šafránek
- Jarzynski equality
- Jasper Kirkby
- Javier Solana
- Jayant Narlikar
- Jayme Tiomno
- Jaynes' principle
- Jaynes–Cummings model
- Jean-Antoine Nollet
- Jean-Baptiste-Charles-Joseph Bélanger
- Jean-Baptiste Biot
- Jean-Baptiste Pérès
- Jean-Charles de Borda
- Jean-Daniel Colladon
- Jean-Marc Lévy-Leblond
- Jean-Marie Duhamel
- Jean-Pierre Luminet
- Jean-Pierre Vigier
- Jean Audouze
- Jean Baptiste Perrin
- Jean Becquerel
- Jean Bricmont
- Jean Cabannes
- Jean Charles Athanase Peltier
- Jean Claude Eugène Péclet
- Jean Emile Charon
- Jean Ginibre
- Jean Henri van Swinden
- Jean Léonard Marie Poiseuille
- Jean M. Bennett
- Jean Morlet
- Jean Picard
- Jean Robieux
- Jean Tatlock
- Jean de Hautefeuille
- Jean le Rond d'Alembert
- Jeans instability
- Jearl Walker
- Jeff Schmidt (writer)
- Jeffrey A. Harvey
- Jeffrey Goldstone
- Jeffrey Mandula
- Jeffrey Satinover
- Jeffrey Weeks (mathematician)
- Jefimenko's equations
- Jellium
- Jens Eisert
- Jens Frahm
- Jens Martin Knudsen
- Jeremiah P. Ostriker
- Jeremy C. Smith (scientist)
- Jeremy O'Brien
- Jeremy Whitlock
- Jerk (physics)
- Jeroen van den Brink
- Jerome Isaac Friedman
- Jerome Wolken
- Jerrold R. Zacharias
- Jerry Goldstein
- Jerry R. Ehman
- Jerry Tersoff
- Jerzy Plebański
- Jerzy Pniewski
- Jesse Beams
- Jesse Ramsden
- Jet (fluid)
- Jet (particle physics)
- Jet Propulsion Laboratory
- Jet Propulsion Laboratory Science Division
- Jet engine performance
- Jet force
- Jet noise
- Jet quenching
- Jiang Mianheng
- Jiggle syphon
- Jim Al-Khalili
- Jim Bohlen
- Jim Peebles
- Jindřich Bačkovský
- Joan Curran
- Joan Feynman
- Joan Hinton
- Joan Vaccaro
- Joanna Haigh
- Joaquin Mazdak Luttinger
- Jocelyn Bell Burnell
- Jochen Heisenberg
- Joe F. Thompson
- Joe Farman
- Joel H. Ferziger
- Joel Lebowitz
- Jog (dislocations)
- Jogesh Pati
- Johan Peter Holtsmark
- Johan Wilcke
- Johann Baptiste Horvath
- Johann Christian Poggendorff
- Johann Georg Halske
- Johann Georg Tralles
- Johann Georg von Soldner
- Johann Gottlieb Nörremberg
- Johann Heinrich Jakob Müller
- Johann Jakob Balmer
- Johann Jakob Müller
- Johann Josef Loschmidt
- Johann Nikuradse
- Johann Rafelski
- Johann Schweigger
- Johann Tobias Mayer
- Johann Wilhelm Hittorf
- Johann Wilhelm Ritter
- Johannes Bosscha
- Johannes Browallius
- Johannes Diderik van der Waals
- Johannes Fischer
- Johannes Franz Hartmann
- Johannes Georg Bednorz
- Johannes Hentschel
- Johannes Juilfs
- Johannes Kepler
- Johannes Petrus Kuenen
- Johannes Rydberg
- Johannes Stark
- John A. Dillon
- John A. McClelland
- John A. Sanderson
- John A. Smolin
- John Adam Fleming
- John Adams (physicist)
- John Aitken (meteorologist)
- John Albery
- John Alexander Simpson
- John Ambrose Fleming
- John Anderson (natural philosopher)
- John Archibald Wheeler
- John Backus (acoustician)
- John Bardeen
- John Baumgardner
- John Brashear
- John Bray (physician)
- John Browning (scientific instrument maker)
- John C. Baez
- John C. Browne
- John C. Mather
- John C. Slater
- John C. Taschner
- John Canton
- John Cardy
- John Challifour
- John Clarke (physicist)
- John Clive Ward
- John Cockcroft
- John Cunningham McLennan
- John Currie Gunn
- John D. Anderson
- John D. Barrow
- John D. Kraus
- John D. Lawson (scientist)
- John D. Strong
- John D. Wiley
- John Dalton
- John David Jackson (physicist)
- John Desmond Bernal
- John Dollond
- John Ellis (physicist, born 1946)
- John F. Allen (physicist)
- John Fitzallen Moore
- John Frederic Daniell
- John Freely
- John G. Anderson
- John G. Cramer
- John G. King (physicist)
- John G. Taylor
- John G. Trump
- John Gamble Kirkwood
- John H. Brodie
- John H. Fremlin
- John H. Gibbons (scientist)
- John H. Hoffman
- John H. Hubbell
- John H. Lawrence
- John H. Manley
- John Hagelin
- John Hall Gladstone
- John Harnad
- John Hartnett (physicist)
- John Hasbrouck Van Vleck
- John Hegarty (academic)
- John Henry Dallmeyer
- John Henry Michell
- John Henry Poynting
- John Henry Schwarz
- John Herapath
- John Herbert Chapman
- John Heuser
- John Hinch (mathematician)
- John Holdren
- John Hopfield
- John Hopkinson
- John Hopps (physicist)
- John Howard (optometrist)
- John Hubbard (physicist)
- John Iliopoulos
- John Jacob Bausch
- John James Waterston
- John Joly
- John Joseph Montgomery
- John Kanzius
- John Kendrew
- John Kerr (physicist)
- John L. Hall
- John L. Lumley
- John L. Moll
- John Larry Kelly, Jr.
- John Leslie (physicist)
- John Lighton Synge
- John Linsley
- John Loveday
- John M. Cowley
- John M. Dawson
- John M. Greene
- John M. Grunsfeld
- John Maddox
- John Madey
- John Mallard
- John Marburger
- John Markert (physicist)
- John Mauchly
- John McCowan
- John Milne
- John Milton Miller
- John Mitchell Nuttall
- John Moffat (physicist)
- John N. Bahcall
- John Napier
- John Nye (scientist)
- John Oren Reed
- John Papaloizou
- John Pasta
- John Paul Wild
- John Pendry
- John Perdew
- John Pethica
- John Playfair
- John Poindexter
- John Polkinghorne
- John Pople
- John Preskill
- John Quincy Stewart
- John R. Arthur, Jr.
- John R. Dunning
- John R. Kirtley
- John R. Klauder
- John R. Wiegand
- John R. Winckler
- John Randall (physicist)
- John Rarity
- John Reppy
- John Rettaliata
- John Reynolds (physicist)
- John Riley Holt
- John Robert Beyster
- John Robert Schrieffer
- John Robert Taylor
- John Robert Woodyard
- John Robison (physicist)
- John Ross (chemist)
- John Ruhl (physicist)
- John S. Toll
- John Scales Avery
- John Scott Russell
- John Sealy Townsend
- John Steinhoff
- John Stewart Bell
- John Strutt, 3rd Baron Rayleigh
- John Stuart Foster
- John T. Hayward
- John T. Houghton
- John Tasker Henderson
- John Thomas Romney Robinson
- John Tuzo Wilson
- John Tyndall
- John V. Wehausen
- John Vidale
- John Vincent Atanasoff
- John Viriamu Jones
- John W. Hutchinson
- John W. Miles
- John Wikswo
- John Winthrop (educator)
- John Zeleny
- John Ziman
- John von Neumann
- Johnsen–Rahbek effect
- Johnson–Holmquist damage model
- Johnson–Nyquist noise
- Joint European Torus
- Joint Institute for Nuclear Astrophysics
- Joint Institute for Nuclear Research
- Joint entropy
- Joint quantum entropy
- Jolly balance
- Jon Orloff
- Jonathan A. Jones
- Jonathan Dowling
- Jonathan Homer Lane
- Jonathan Lunine
- Jonathan M. Dorfan
- Jonathan Oppenheim
- Jones calculus
- Jook Walraven
- Jordan and Einstein frames
- Jordan–Wigner transformation
- Jordin Kare
- Jorg Wrachtrup
- Jorge A. Swieca
- Jorge Crispim Romão
- Jorge E. Hirsch
- Jorge Pullin
- Jorge Sabato
- Jos Engelen
- Jose Acacio de Barros
- Josef Finger
- Josef Kozeny
- Josef Lense
- Josef Mattauch
- Josef Meixner
- Josef Schintlmeister
- Joseph Black
- Joseph Boussinesq
- Joseph D. Sneed
- Joseph Dwyer (physicist)
- Joseph Fourier
- Joseph Francisco
- Joseph H. Eberly
- Joseph H. Rush
- Joseph Henry
- Joseph Henry Keenan
- Joseph Hooton Taylor, Jr.
- Joseph Incandela
- Joseph Jackson Lister
- Joseph Jacobson
- Joseph Kaplan
- Joseph Larmor
- Joseph Louis Gay-Lussac
- Joseph Louis Lagrange
- Joseph Lykken
- Joseph Nordgren
- Joseph Petavel
- Joseph Plateau
- Joseph Polchinski
- Joseph Rotblat
- Joseph Sauveur
- Joseph Stefan
- Joseph Swan
- Joseph Sweetman Ames
- Joseph Valentin Boussinesq
- Joseph W. Goodman
- Joseph Weber
- Joseph Zähringer
- Joseph von Fraunhofer
- Josephson effect
- Josephson phase
- Josephson vortex
- Joshua N. Goldberg
- Joshua Silver
- Josiah Willard Gibbs
- Josip Križan
- José Antonio Balseiro
- José Enrique Moyal
- José Fernando Ferreira Mendes
- José Goldemberg
- José Leite Lopes
- José W. F. Valle
- Joukowsky transform
- Joule
- Joule's laws
- Joule heating
- Joule per mole
- Joule–Thomson effect
- Jounce
- Journal de Physique
- Journal of Applied Physics
- Journal of Biomedical Materials Research Part B
- Journal of Biophotonics
- Journal of Chemical Physics
- Journal of Computational Acoustics
- Journal of Computational Physics
- Journal of Cosmology
- Journal of Electroceramics
- Journal of Experimental and Theoretical Physics
- Journal of Fluid Mechanics
- Journal of Geophysics and Engineering
- Journal of High Energy Physics
- Journal of Instrumentation
- Journal of Lightwave Technology
- Journal of Luminescence
- Journal of Materials Science
- Journal of Materials Science: Materials in Electronics
- Journal of Materials Science: Materials in Medicine
- Journal of Mathematical Physics
- Journal of Nanoparticle Research
- Journal of Nanoscience and Nanotechnology
- Journal of Optics (IOP Publishing)
- Journal of Optics A
- Journal of Physics: Condensed Matter
- Journal of Physics: Conference Series
- Journal of Physics A
- Journal of Physics A: General Physics
- Journal of Physics A: Mathematical, Nuclear and General
- Journal of Physics A: Mathematical and General
- Journal of Physics B
- Journal of Physics C
- Journal of Physics D
- Journal of Physics F
- Journal of Physics G
- Journal of Radioanalytical and Nuclear Chemistry
- Journal of Rheology
- Journal of Scientific Exploration
- Journal of Sound and Vibration
- Journal of Statistical Mechanics: Theory and Experiment
- Journal of Statistical Physics
- Journal of Thermal Analysis and Calorimetry
- Journal of Vacuum Science and Technology
- Journal of the Acoustical Society of America
- Journal of the American Ceramic Society
- Journal of the European Optical Society: Rapid Publications
- Journal of the Korean Physical Society
- Journal of the Optical Society of America
- Journal of the Optical Society of America A
- Journal of the Optical Society of America B
- Journal of the Physical Society of Japan
- Jovan Karamata
- Jozef T. Devreese
- João Magueijo
- Joël Scherk
- Jpn. J. Appl. Phys
- Juan Carlos Campuzano
- Juan Gualterio Roederer
- Juan Ignacio Cirac Sasturain
- Juan José Giambiagi
- Juan Martín Maldacena
- Juan Pablo Paz
- Jules-Émile Verschaffelt
- Jules Jamin
- Jules Violle
- Julian Barbour
- Julian Schwinger
- Julio César Gutiérrez Vega
- Julio Gea-Banacloche
- Julio Navarro (astrophysicist)
- Julius Bartels
- Julius Edgar Lilienfeld
- Julius H. Taylor
- Julius Plücker
- Julius Wess
- Julius Wilhelm Gintl
- Julius von Mayer
- Jun-ichi Nishizawa
- Jun Kondo
- Junction temperature
- Jupiter mass
- Jurij Vega
- Juris Upatnieks
- Justus Mühlenpfordt
- János Kertész
- Józef Bem
- Józef Zawadzki (chemist)
- Józef Łukaszewicz
- Jørg Tofte Jebsen
- Jürg Fröhlich
- Jürgen Ehlers
- Jürgen Warnatz
- Jōyō (nuclear reactor)
