= Šafránek =

Šafránek (feminine Šafránková) is a Czech surname derived from the word šafrán (saffron). Notable people include:

- František Šafránek, Czech footballer
- Jaroslav Šafránek, Czech physicist
- Kateřina Šafránková, Czech athlete
- Libuše Šafránková, Czech actress
- Robert Safranek, American engineer
- Václav Šafránek, Czech tennis player
- Vincent Frank Safranek, Czech-American musician

See also the Hungarian fictional character Safranek.
