= John Markert =

John Markert may refer to:

- John Markert (physicist), physicist at the University of Texas at Austin
- John Markert (politician) (c. 1930–2011), New Jersey politician who served in the state's General Assembly
