= John Hartnett =

John Hartnett can refer to:

- John Hartnett (athlete) (born 1950), Irish athlete
- John Hartnett (hurler) (born 1960), Irish hurler
- John Hartnett (physicist) (born 1952), Australian cosmologist
