= J. F. Thompson =

J. F. Thompson may refer to:

- James Frederick Thompson (1884–1966), New Zealand solicitor and politician
- Joe F. Thompson, American aerospace engineer
