= Mary Warga =

American physicist

Mary Elizabeth Warga
- Born: 1904
- Died: 1991 (aged 86–87)

Mary Elizabeth Warga (1904–1991) was an American physicist, for many years the executive secretary of the Optical Society of America. Before taking that role, she was a professor of physics at the University of Pittsburgh, focusing on spectroscopy.

== Early life and education ==
Warga was born on February 5, 1904, in Donora, Pennsylvania, the daughter of John Warga and Mary Ellen Obruba.

She was educated at the University of Pittsburgh, where she received a bachelor's degree in 1926, a master's degree in 1928, and a Ph.D. in 1937. Her master's thesis was Magnesium Triplets in Arc and Solar Spectra, and her doctoral dissertation was Spectrographic Determination of Tin in Steel.

== Career and later life ==
She continued as a professor of physics at the University of Pittsburgh, where she became director of the spectroscopy laboratory. The United States Air Force brought her to several countries in Europe to compare the equipment they were using for spectroscopy, and much of her own research concerned the spectroscopic analysis of chemicals in the upper atmosphere.

During this time, Warga was active in the leadership of the Optical Society of America, including serving four years in its board of directors. The society established a permanent executive office in 1958, and in 1959, Warga took a leave of absence from the University of Pittsburgh to become the first executive secretary of the society. Although taking charge of much of the business work of the society, she was described as more social than oriented to business detail: society president John A. Sanderson stated that "she knew something good about each member, and was always eager to tell it".

In 1969, the society created an executive director office, leaving Warga's role as largely ceremonial. She retired as "executive secretary emeritus" in 1972, but remained active in society affairs for several years after that. She died in late 1991.

== Recognition ==
Warga was named as a Distinguished Daughter of Pennsylvania in 1954.

She was elected to the inaugural class of Fellows of the Optical Society of America in 1959, and in 1973 became the inaugural recipient of the society's Stephen D. Fantone Distinguished Service Award, "in appreciation of her advancement in optics by her long devotion to the Society's affairs".
