= Concentric siphon =

The concentric siphon or annular siphon is a rarer embodiment of the siphon which has the discharge tube separate from the inlet tube, with the opening of the outlet within the inlet tube. It has the advantages of taking up less space and of being able to be constructed with straight tubes and standard fittings, with no need for forming a U in the tube.

The concentric siphon was first described by Ancient Greek engineer Hero of Alexandria as demonstration 2 in the book Pneumatica. He notes correctly that its means of operation is identical to the more familiar U-shaped siphon.

The concentric siphon was used extensively in toilet cisterns as a means of delivering a bulk discharge of water to flush a toilet etc., this use persisting to the present. It is also used in wastewater treatment systems.

A minor use is in some types of Soxhlet extractor, where a concentric siphon is noted in advertising material as being more robust and having a lower volume than a U siphon.
