= Siphon (disambiguation) =

A siphon is a tube in an inverted U shape which enables a liquid, under the pull of gravity, to flow upwards and then downwards to discharge at a lower level.

Siphon may also refer to:

- Soda siphon, device used for dispensing carbonated water
- Siphon (insect anatomy)
- Siphon (mollusc), an organ of many aquatic molluscs through which water (or air) flows
- Oral siphon of Urochordata
- Siphon (horse), a racehorse
- Carotid siphon, a portion of the human internal carotid artery running through the cavernous sinus
- Siphon (cave), a passage in a cave that is submerged under water
- Anti-siphoning law, a term in television broadcasting
- GWR Siphon, a series of enclosed milk churn transport wagons built by the Great Western Railway
