= Papaloizou–Pringle instability =

Astrophysical theory

The Papaloizou-Pringle Instability (PPI) is a scientific discovery made in 1984 by theoretical physicist John Papaloizou and James E. Pringle which proposes that tori, or accretion disks, in anisotropic stellar systems with constant specific angular momentum are unstable to non-axisymmetric global modes.

== History ==
Linear analysis of the instability was first outlined by Papaloizou and Pringle in 1984. Relativistic numerical studies confirmed the effects of the instability, probed the non-linear effects primarily responsible for setting the final amplitude of the global modes, and showed that the resulting matter distribution exhibited counter-rotating epicyclic vortices (also called planets).
