= Coopers School =

Coordinates: 51°24′28″N 0°04′24″E

Orion Coopers School

Location
- Hawkwood Lane; Chislehurst, Kent, BR7 5PS; England

Information
- Type: Academy, all ability
- Motto: Trust, Kindness and Endeavour; Haec tibi consecro
- Established: 1939
- Trust: Orion Education (Formerly E21C)
- Department for Education URN: 136464 Tables
- Ofsted: Reports
- Principal: Janina Aitken
- Staff: 96 qualified teachers in 2010
- Gender: Mixed
- Age: 11 to 18
- Enrolment: 1,400
- Capacity: 1,629
- Website: https://www.orioncoopers.org.uk

Orion Coopers School (Formerly Coopers School) is a mixed secondary school with academy status in Chislehurst in the London Borough of Bromley, England. The current Head of School is Janina Aitken.

The site is on land between Chislehurst Common and the National Trust's Hawkwood Estate, an area of working farmland and woodland, and is above the Chislehurst Caves.

As of 2023 the school had about 1,400 students, of whom approximately 222 were in the sixth form.

The school was inspected by Ofsted in 2023 and rated good.

== History ==
The school was first established in 1939 as the Sidcup Day Commercial School, with headmistress Miss Scorrer. After World War II, in 1946, a second site linked to the Sidcup school was established at Hawkwood Lane, Chislehurst. The new school eventually became known as the Chislehurst and Sidcup Technical High School for Girls and in 1949 Mary Anderson was appointed head teacher.

By 1969 the Chislehurst site had been further developed, with several new buildings, and the two schools split. The Chislehurst school became Coopers School, named after the Coopers Mansion House which stood on the site. The house is still standing, and has recently been refurbished to become the school's sixth form centre. Later, in 1969 later school accepted its first intake of 37 boys.

In 1981 the school became an all-ability comprehensive school. The school became a specialist Technology College in 2002, and was renamed Coopers Technology College. In February 2012 the school converted to an academy. It subsequently renamed itself Coopers School. In late 2018, the school joined the Orion Education multi-academy trust (formerly Education for the 21st Century(E21C)).

The house system was removed in 2021. The system previously divided students into the houses Pankhurst, Wilberforce, Newton and Franklin.

Until 2023, the school shared a site with the community special school Marjorie McClure. Marjorie McClure School moved to a new purpose-built site in Chislehurst on 5 July 2023.

== Achievements ==
The school won a national award for ICT in 2006, for using computers to improve the way in which it is run. The school's website allows extensive interactive access to school information by staff, students, parents and governors through its learning gateway.

== Notable alumni ==
- Tom Allen – comedian
- Rob Beckett – comedian
- John Loveday – physicist
- Charlie Clements – actor
- Michael Gunning - swimmer
- Sam Matterface - sports presenter and commentator
- Lewis Burton - tennis player
- George Porter - footballer
- JJ Hooper - footballer
- Grant Basey - footballer
- Ade Azeez - footballer
- Skye Newman - singer
