= Z-tube =

Z-tube

The Z-tube is an experimental apparatus for measuring the tensile strength of a liquid.

It consists of a Z-shaped tube with open ends, filled with a liquid, and set on top of a spinning table. If the tube were straight, the liquid would immediately fly out one end or the other of the tube as it began to spin. By bending the ends of the tube back towards the center of rotation, a shift of the liquid away from center will result in the water level in one end of the tube rising and thus increasing the pressure in that end of the tube, and consequently returning the liquid to the center of the tube. By measuring the rotational speed and the distance from the center of rotation to the liquid level in the bent ends of the tube, the pressure reduction inside the tube can be calculated.

Negative pressures, (i.e. less than zero absolute pressure, or in other words, tension) have been reported using water processed to remove dissolved gases. Tensile strengths up to 280 atmospheres have been reported for water in glass.
