= John A. McClelland =

Irish physicist

John Alexander McClelland FRS (1 December 1870 – 13 April 1920) was an Irish physicist known for pioneering work on the scattering of β rays, the conductivity of gases, and the mobility of ions.

== Biography ==
McClelland was the son of William McClelland of Dunallis, Coleraine and received his education at Queen's College, Galway. In 1895 he received a fellowship from the Royal University of Ireland and spent 1896–1900 at Cavendish Laboratory, while pursuing a research degree at Cambridge.

In 1900 he was appointed Professor of Experimental Physics at University College, Dublin. Among his other posts McClelland served as a Commissioner of National Education, a member of the Senate of the National University of Ireland and, in 1907, secretary to the Royal Irish Academy. During World War I he served as a member of the Inventions Committee and the Committee for Organisation in Industrial Research.

In 1909 he was elected a Fellow of the Royal Society and in 1917 was awarded the Boyle medal of the Royal Dublin Society.

In 1901 married Ina Esdale. They had five children.

John A. McClelland died on 13 April 1920.
