= Joseph H. Rush =

American parapsychologist

Joseph Harold Rush (April 17, 1911 – September 12, 2006) was a physicist, parapsychologist and author. He was the first secretary-treasurer of the Federation of American Scientists, and published numerous articles and two textbooks.

Rush was born in Mt. Calm, Texas. In the 1930s his employment as a radio operator in the Dallas Police Department became a way to support his family during the Great Depression. After earning a master's degree in physics, he taught at Texas Technical College in Lubbock and at Denison University. In 1944 he joined the Manhattan Project at the Clinton Engineer Works in Oak Ridge, Tennessee. After the end of the war, he became secretary-treasurer of the Federation of American Scientists, working in Washington to secure civilian control of nuclear power.

Rush received his PhD in physics from Duke University in 1950, and moved to Boulder, Colorado, to work at the High Altitude Observatory of the University of Colorado. He joined the National Center for Atmospheric Research upon its inception, and retired in 1974.

Over his lifetime, Rush authored many articles and books, including The Dawn of Life, a book examining the origins of life on Earth, and Foundations of Parapsychology: Exploring the Boundaries of Human Capability, a textbook on parapsychology.
