= James E. Pringle =

British astrophysicist

James Edward Pringle (born 20 January 1949) is a British astrophysicist. He is a professor of theoretical astronomy at the Institute of Astronomy, Cambridge part of the University of Cambridge.

His research is focused mainly on astrophysical fluid dynamics and accretion discs, including, for example, the formation of stars and planets, accretion of matter onto black holes, and formation of jets by accretion flows. In a 1984 paper, he and John Papaloizou showed that accretion disks in anisotropic stellar systems with constant specific angular momentum are unstable to non-axisymmetric global modes. This phenomenon is now known as the Papaloizou–Pringle instability.

He was awarded the Eddington Medal in 2009.
