= Jiggle syphon =

Combination of a syphon pipe and a priming pump

A jiggle syphon (or siphon) is the combination of a syphon pipe and a simple priming pump that uses mechanical shaking action to pump enough liquid up the pipe to reach the highest point, and thus start the syphoning action.

== Principle of operation ==
The jiggle pump consists of a chamber, in line with the end of the pipe that sits in the liquid to be moved. The chamber is somewhat wider than the pipe, and narrows to approximately the pipe diameter at both ends. One end attaches to the pipe, the other end is open to the liquid. Within the chamber is a sphere, denser than the liquid to be pumped, small enough to move freely within the chamber but large enough to not be able to leave the chamber.

To begin with, gravity holds the sphere at the bottom, open, end of the chamber, although hydrostatic pressure will force the liquid up and around the sphere upon immersion. When the pipe is vigorously shaken up and down, the sphere moves upwards, lifting some liquid in the pipe; then when it falls down again, the increased hydrostatic pressure within the pipe (which now has a higher head of fluid in it than the surrounding container) pushes the sphere down and prevents the liquid flowing back. Repeated "jigglings" lift the fluid up the pipe until it reaches the highest point in the pipe, whereupon gravity causes it to start to flow down the other side, and the syphon action will "suck" the liquid through the system. This causes the pressure in the pipe to drop below the hydrostatic pressure in the container, so the sphere is lifted upwards, allowing the liquid to flow.

== See also ==
- Syphon for the principles and practice of syphoning.
