= Robert Safranek =

American electrical engineer

Robert J. Safranek from the Benevue, Inc., Warren, New Jersey, was named Fellow of the Institute of Electrical and Electronics Engineers (IEEE) in 2015 for contributions to perceptual image and video compression and quality.
