= John Tasker Henderson =

Canadian physicist (1905–1983)

- Born: 9 December 1905; Montreal, Quebec, Canada
- Died: 2 January 1983 (aged 77); Perth, Ontario, Canada
- Education: McGill University; King's College London
- Known for: Radar development
- Scientific career
- Fields: Physics and engineering
- Workplaces: National Research Council of Canada, Royal Canadian Air Force
- Doctoral advisor: Edward Victor Appleton

John Tasker Henderson (9 December 1905 – 2 January 1983) was a Canadian Physicist whose career was with the National Research Council (NRC). Educated at McGill and London, Henderson joined the NRC in 1933 where he worked on the effects of the ionosphere on radio signals and the Direction Finder invented by A.G.L. McNaughton and W.A. Steel.

In 1939, he became involved with the secret radar development and is particularly recognized for his leadership role in this technology during World War II, laying the foundations for radar research and manufacture in Canada. Henderson returned to the NRC after RCAF and diplomatic service from 1942 to 1947 and became head of its electricity section, which built several cesium atomic clocks.

== Early life ==
Henderson was born in Montreal, Quebec. He received the B.S. and M.S. degrees in engineering physics from McGill University, and then went to England, where he studied under Professor Edward Victor Appleton. He received the PhD degree in physics from King's College London in 1932, and followed this with post-doctoral studies at the Sorbonne in Paris and the Technische Hochschule in Munich. In 1933, he joined the NRC in Ottawa as chief of the Radio Section. Over the next several years, his work included the building of a highly advanced radio direction-finding set that used a CRT for its display; this was installed in Nova Scotia in 1938.

== Second World War ==
In early 1939, Henderson was selected to represent Canada in a series of highly classified briefings in Great Britain concerning developments in the Air Ministry on Range and Direction Finding (RDF – later called radar). This was largely coordinated by Robert Watson-Watt at RAF Bawdsey, with the purpose of preparing the Commonwealth of Nations to have indigenous developments in this technology.

Upon Henderson's return from the briefings in England, arrangements were made between the Canadian and American governments for him to visit a number of facilities in the U.S. Following this, he prepared a detailed report that included proposed plans for bringing the NRC into the RDF activities. Within a short time, he was authorized to set up a development laboratory for this in the NRC Radio Section. Its first project was the development of s surface-warning radar system for the Royal Canadian Navy. Using commercial components and with essentially no further assistance from Great Britain, a system was developed to protect the entrance to the Halifax Harbour, called Night Watchman, tested in June 1940. This was followed by a ship-borne system designated Surface Warning 1st Canadian (SW1C) completed in May 1941.

In the summer of 1940, Great Britain was at the limit of production capability and desperately needed allies for her war effort. Arrangements were made for an exchange of classified information with the United States. For this, Sir. Henry Tizard assembled a delegation for what came to be known as the Tizard Mission. On the way to Washington, D.C., Tizard and others went by Ottawa and briefed NRC officials and also visited the Radio Section. Highly impressed, Tizard asked that Henderson join the delegation to represent Canada at the exchanges. The new cavity magnetron developed in Great Britain was a key item; at the Washington meeting, Henderson was asked to take the lead in both manufacturing this unit in Canada as well as developing microwave radars using the magnetron.

By the end of 1940, Henderson's organization was elevated to Branch level and many engineers and scientists were added. For testing the systems, a secure Radio Field Station was set up near Ottawa. To manufacture the hardware, a Crown company, Research Enterprises Limited (REL), was established, with a large facility near Toronto, Ontario. The NRC's Radio Branch remained at the center of radar development in Canada throughout World War II. Many radar systems were designed at this facility during the war years – a total of 30 of all types.

After laying the foundation for research and manufacturing of radar in Canada, in 1942 Henderson became a senior officer in the Royal Canadian Air Force (RCAF). For the next three years, he was in RCAF Radar and Signals units with assignments in Canada, Newfoundland, England, and Germany. After the war, he was a scientific advisor to the Canadian delegation of the United Nations' Commission on Atomic Energy.

== Post-war ==
Near the end of 1947, Henderson returned to the NRC to head the Canadian part of SHORAN, an interdepartmental project to apply radar techniques to aerial surveying. In 1949, he was placed in charge of the Electricity Section in the Applied Physics Division; here, he set up new absolute electrical standards for Canada in conformity with international agreements. Among other activities, he led the development of several caesium-133 atomic clocks that were accepted in 1967 as the international timekeeping standard. He eventually became the Principal Research Officer of the NRC, a position he held until his retirement in 1970.

John T. Henderson died in Perth, Ontario, on 2 January 1983

== Recognition ==
In 1943, Henderson was awarded the Member of the Order of the British Empire, Dominion of Canada, for his pioneer work in the radar field. He was made a Fellow of the Royal Society of Canada, a Fellow of the Institute of Radio Engineers (IRE), and in 1963 was elected as President of the newly merged Institute of Electrical and Electronics Engineers (IEEE). In 1969, he was the first recipient of the McNaughton Medal, an annual award given by the IEEE Canada in recognition of contributions to the engineering profession.

== General references ==
- Avery, Donald H.; The Science of War: Canadian Scientists and Allied Military Technology, Univ. Toronto Press, 1999; ISBN 978-0-8020-5996-3
- Middleton, W. E. Knowles; Radar Development in Canada: The Radio Branch of the National Research Council of Canada 1939-1946, Wilfrid Laurier Univ. Press, 1981; ISBN 0-88920-106-4
- Watson, Raymond C. Jr.; Radar Origins Worldwide: History of Its Evolution in 13 Nations Through World War II, Traford Publishing, 2009; ISBN 978-1-4269-2111-7
