= Moshe Carmeli =

- משה כרמלי
- Born: June 15, 1933; Baghdad, Iraq
- Died: September 27, 2007 (aged 74); Beer-Sheva, Israel
- Citizenship: Dual: Israeli and United States
- Occupations: Albert Einstein Professor of Theoretical Physics, Ben Gurion University of the Negev, Beer-Sheva, Israel
- Known for: Gauge theory, cosmological general relativity
- Spouse: Elisheva
- Children: 3

Academic background
- Education: Master of Science, The Hebrew University of Jerusalem, Jerusalem, Israel; Doctor of Science, Technion-Israel Institute of Technology, Haifa, Israel
- Doctoral advisor: Nathan Rosen
- Other advisor: N. Zeldes
- Website: Website

Moshe Carmeli (Hebrew: משה כרמלי; 1933–2007) was the Albert Einstein Professor of Theoretical Physics, Ben Gurion University (BGU), Beer Sheva, Israel and president of the Israel Physical Society. He received his D.Sc. from the Technion-Israel Institute of Technology in 1964. He became the first full professor at BGU's new Department of Physics. He did significant theoretical work in the fields of cosmology, astrophysics, general and special relativity, gauge theory, and mathematical physics, authoring 4 books, co-authoring 4 others, and publishing 128 refereed research papers in various journals and forums, plus assorted other publications (146 in all). He is most notable for his work on gauge theory and his development of the theory of cosmological general relativity, which extends Albert Einstein's theory of general relativity from a four-dimensional spacetime to a five-dimensional space-velocity framework.

== Biography ==
Carmeli was born in Baghdad, Iraq in 1933. However, he spent the majority of his life and career in Israel and the United States of America. In 1960, he received his Masters of Science from The Hebrew University of Jerusalem under the supervision of N. Zeldes. In 1964, he received his Doctor of Science from the Technion-Israel Institute of Technology in Haifa, Israel under the supervision of Nathan Rosen.

After completion of his degree, he moved to the United States, where he stayed until 1972. From 1964 until 1967, he worked at Temple University and later at the University of Maryland, where he was an assistant professor. In 1967 he became a researcher (and later senior researcher) at the Aerospace Research Laboratory in Dayton, Ohio. He was twice recognized for outstanding work by the United States Air Force.

In 1972, Carmeli then returned to Israel as an associate professor of physics at Ben-Gurion University in the newly established Physics Department. In 1974, he was elevated to full professor, making him the first full professor in the Physics Department. During this period, from 1973 to 1977, he also served as the department's chairman.

In 1979, he was made Albert Einstein Professor of Theoretical Physics, a title he held for the remaining 28 years of his life. The following year, he became the director of the Center for Theoretical Physics at BGU, a position he held until 1989. From 1979 to 1982, he was the vice president of the Israel Physical Society, and then became the president of the society through 1985.

Carmeli remained active in research in theoretical physics, as well as becoming involved in science on the world stage. He was a member of many scientific societies, including the American Physical Society, American Association for the Advancement of Science, and The New York Academy of Sciences, and was listed in both Who's Who in the World and Who's Who in Science and Technology. He actively refereed and reviewed hundreds of scientific works by noted scientists seeking publication in over a dozen scientific journals. He held visiting professorships at the C. N. Yang Institute of Theoretical Physics of the State University of New York at Stony Brook, the University of Maryland, the International Center for Theoretical Physics in Trieste, the Max Planck Institute for Astrophysics in Munich, the University of Massachusetts, Colgate University, Queen Mary College of the University of London, and the State University of Campinas in Brazil. He was invited four times by the Swedish Royal Academy of Sciences to nominate candidates for the Nobel Prize in Physics. He was also invited four times by the Wolf Foundation to nominate candidates for the Wolf Prize in Physics.

Carmeli died in 2007 in Beer-Sheva, Israel.

== Cosmological general relativity ==
In the 1990s, Carmeli developed a new cosmological theory called cosmological general relativity. He took Einstein's theory of general relativity and extended it into five dimensions, adding the radial velocity of galaxies expanding in the Hubble flow as the fifth dimension. This fifth dimension is known as space-velocity. He published his initial special relativistic version of the theory in 1997 in his book Cosmological Special Relativity: The Large-Scale Structure of Space, Time, and Velocity. He then developed the complete general relativistic theory called cosmological general relativity, publishing several papers on its implications over the next decade.

== Research interests ==
- Cosmology
- Astrophysics
- General relativity
- Special relativity
- Gauge theory
- Mathematical physics
- Statistical physics
- Nuclear physics

== Notable publications ==
=== Books ===
- Carmeli, Moshe (1977). Group Theory and General Relativity. McGraw-Hill.
- Carmeli, Moshe (1982). Classical Fields: General Relativity and Gauge Theory. Wiley Interscience.
- Carmeli, Moshe (1983). Statistical Theory and Random Matrices. Dekker.
- Carmeli, Moshe (1997). Cosmological Special Relativity: The Large-Scale Structure of Space, Time and Velocity (2002, 2nd ed.). World Scientific.
- Carmeli, Moshe; Malin, Shimon (1976). Representations of the Rotation and Lorentz Groups. Dekker.
- Carmeli, Moshe; Huleihil, Kh.; Leibowitz, Elhanan (1989). Gauge Fields: Classification and Equations of Motion. World Scientific. Bibcode:1989gfce.book.....C.
- Carmeli, Moshe; Leibowitz, Elhanan; Nissani, Noah (1990). SL(2,C) Gauge Theory and Conservation Laws. World Scientific.
- Carmeli, Moshe; Malin, Shimon (2000). Theory of Spinors: An Introduction. World Scientific.

=== Most cited research papers ===
- Carmeli, Moshe (1996). "Cosmological Special Relativity". Foundations of Physics. 26 (3): 413–416. Bibcode:1996FoPh...26..413C. doi:10.1007/BF02069480. S2CID 123365024.
- Carmeli, Moshe (1985). "Field Theory on R x S 3 topology. I: The Klein-Gordon and Schrödinger equations". Foundations of Physics. 15 (2): 175–184. Bibcode:1985FoPh...15..175C. doi:10.1007/BF00735289. S2CID 122973207.
- Carmeli, Moshe (2002). "Accelerating Universe: Theory versus Experiment". arXiv:astro-ph/0205396. Bibcode:2002astro.ph..5396C.
- Carmeli, Moshe (1995). "Cosmological Relativity: A Special Relativity for Cosmology". Foundations of Physics. 25 (7): 1029–1040. Bibcode:1995FoPh...25.1029C. doi:10.1007/BF02059524. S2CID 123491878.
- Carmeli, Moshe (1977). "Reformulation of General Relativity as a Gauge Theory". Annals of Physics. 103 (1): 208–232. Bibcode:1977AnPhy.103..208C. doi:10.1016/0003-4916(77)90270-6.
- Carmeli, Moshe (1972). "Gravitational Lagrangian". Physical Review. 5 (2): 290–293. Bibcode:1972PhRvD...5..290C. doi:10.1103/PhysRevD.5.290.
- Carmeli, Moshe (1998). "Is Galaxy Dark Matter a Property of Spacetime?". International Journal of Theoretical Physics. 37 (10): 2621–2625. arXiv:astro-ph/9607142. Bibcode:1997idm..work...83C. doi:10.1023/a:1026672604958. S2CID 17664377.
- Carmeli, Moshe (1972). "Gauge Fields and Gravitational Field Equations". Nuclear Physics. 38 (2): 621–627. Bibcode:1972NuPhB..38..621C. doi:10.1016/0550-3213(72)90332-X.
- Carmeli, Moshe (1981). "Survey of Cosmological Models with Gravitational, Scalar, and Electromagnetic Waves". Physics Reports. 76 (2): 79–156. Bibcode:1981PhR....76...79C. doi:10.1016/0370-1573(81)90171-X.
- Complete lists of Carmeli's works can be found at Microsoft Academic Search (with links), or at his publications page at Ben Gurion University (text only).
