= J. Kim Vandiver =

- Born: December 4, 1945 (age 80); Yakima, Washington
- Education: Harvey Mudd College (B.S. in Engineering, 1968); MIT (S.M. in Ocean Engineering, 1969); MIT/WHOI Joint Program (Ph.D. in Oceanographic Engineering, 1975)
- Occupation: professor
- Known for: academic work in engineering and founder of the Edgerton Center at the Massachusetts Institute of Technology

J. Kim Vandiver (born December 4, 1945) is an American university professor at the Massachusetts Institute of Technology (MIT). Vandiver is the dean of undergraduate research and a professor of Mechanical and Ocean Engineering. He is one of the foremost authorities on the dynamics of offshore structures and flow-induced vibration and is a member of the faculty of the MIT-WHOI joint program in Oceanography/Applied Ocean Science and Engineering.

Vandiver is also founder and director of the Edgerton Center at MIT, named after and honoring Dr. Harold Edgerton, which was started in 1992 to provide resources for students doing hands-on educational projects, including some in developing countries. He is the director of MIT's Office of Experiential Learning.

He is known for some early work he did with Schlieren photography. One of his photos, "Bullet thru Flame," is at the Amon Carter Museum of American Art in Fort Worth, Texas.

== Memberships ==
Vandiver is a member of the Society of Petroleum Engineers, the Society of Naval Architects and Marine Engineers, the American Society of Civil Engineers, and the American Society of Mechanical Engineers.

== Education ==
He holds a B.S. in Engineering from Harvey Mudd College (1968), a S.M. in Ocean Engineering from MIT (1969), and a Ph.D. in Oceanographic Engineering from the MIT/WHOI Joint Program (1975). He is also a certified flight instructor for gliders.

== Awards and honors ==
- Doherty Professor in Ocean Utilization, 1976
- Arthur Lubinski Best Mechanical Engineering Paper Award, 1984
- Graduate Student Council Teaching Award, 1987
- MIT President's Award for Community Service, 1998 and 1999
- MacVicar Faculty Fellow for Excellence in Teaching, 2001
- MIT Excellence Award given to the staff of the Edgerton Center, 2003
- OTC Distinguished Achievement Award, 2005
- Oilfield Energy Center Hall of Fame for Pioneering Technologies (VIV with Don Allen, Dean Henning, and Li Lee), 2019

== Scouting ==
Vandiver was raised in Yakima, Washington. Vandiver earned the rank of Eagle Scout in 1960. Vandiver recognizes Scouting as an important influence in his life and society. Vandiver was awarded the Distinguished Eagle Scout Award in 2006 by the Boston Minuteman Council of the Boy Scouts of America.

== Selected publications ==
- Vandiver, J. K., A Universal Reduced Damping Parameter for Prediction of Vortex-Induced Vibration, 21st International Conference on OMAE, Paper 28292, June 23–28, 2002, Oslo.
- Vandiver, J. K. and Donnelly, J., The Use of Scatter Diagrams for the Selection of Current Profiles for the Design of a Riser Experiencing Vortex-Induced Vibration, Paper No. 15395, Proceedings of 2003 Offshore Technology Conference, Houston, May 2003.
- Vandiver, J. K. and Peoples, W., The Effect of Staggered Buoyancy Modules on Flow-Induced Vibration of Marine Risers", Paper No. OTC 15284, Proceedings of 2003 Offshore Technology Conference, Houston, May 2003.
- Vandiver, J. K. and Marcollo, H., High Mode Number VIV Experiments, IUTAM Symposium on Integrated Modeling of Fully Coupled Fluid-Structure Interactions Using Analysis, Computations, and Experiments, June 1–6, 2003, Kluwer Academic Publishers, Dordrecht.
- Vandiver, J. K., Marcollo, H., Swithenbank, S., and Jhingran, V., High Mode Number Vortex-Induced Vibration Field Experiments, Offshore Technology Conference, Paper Number 17383, Houston, Texas, May 2–5, 2005.
- Vandiver, J. K., Swithenbank, S., Jaiswal, V., and Marcollo, H., The Effectiveness of Helical Strakes in the Suppression of High-Mode-Number VIV, Offshore Technology Conference, Paper Number 18276-PP, May 1–4, 2006, Houston, Texas. Received the Arthur Lubinski, ASME OTC 2006, Best Paper Award.
- Vandiver, J. K., Swithenbank, S., Jaiswal, V., and Jhingran, V., Fatigue Damage from High Mode Number Vortex-Induced Vibration, Proceedings of OMAE 2006: 25th International Conference on Offshore Mechanics and Arctic Engineering, Paper No. OMAE2006-9240, June 4–9, 2006, Hamburg, Germany.

== See also ==
- Schlieren
