= WD J0651+2844 =

Star in the constellation Gemini

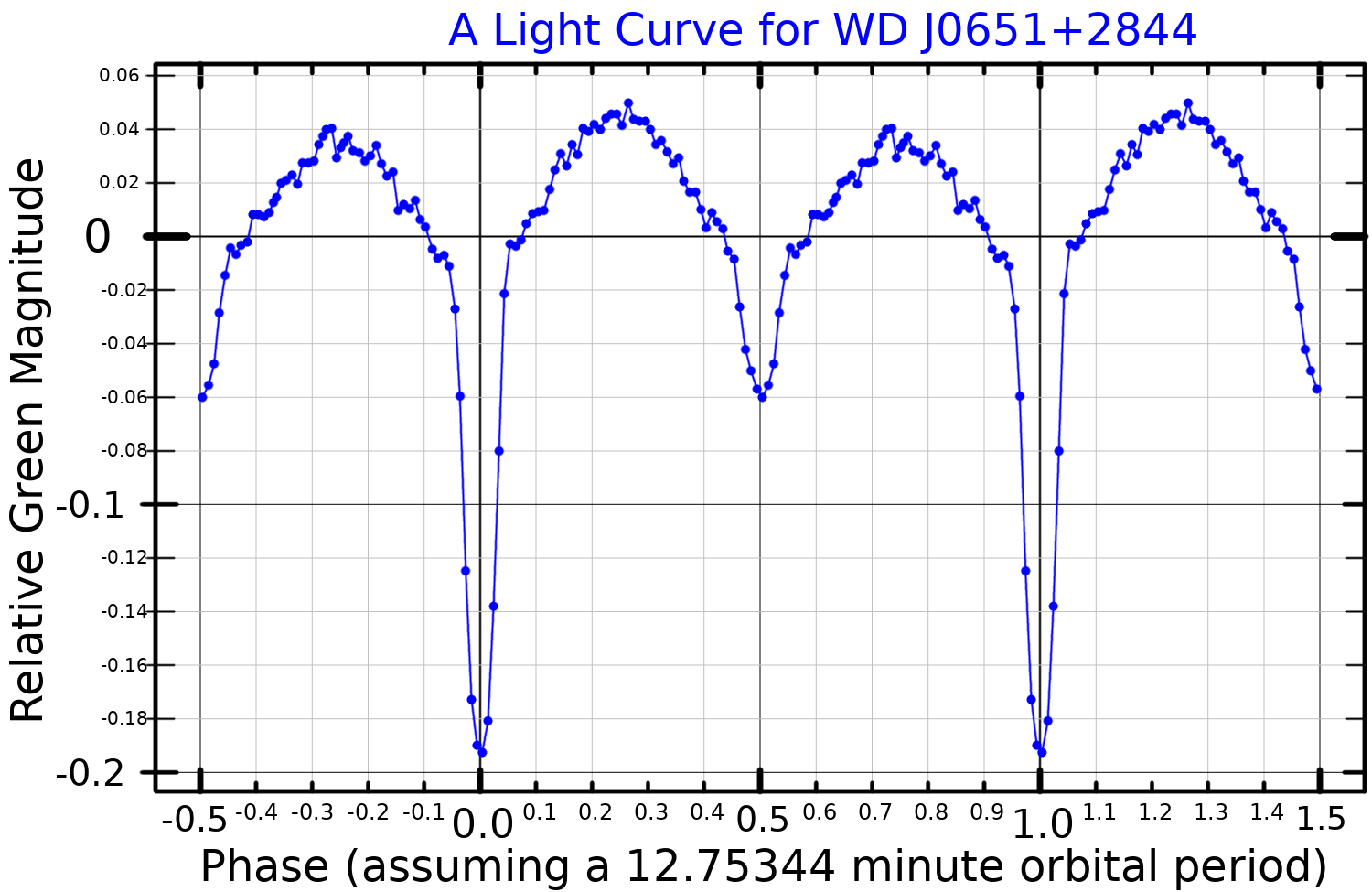
- A green band light curve for WD J0651+2844, adapted from Hermes et al. (2012)

Observation data Epoch J2000 Equinox ICRS
- Constellation: Gemini
- Right ascension: 06^{h} 51^{m} 33.340^{s}
- Declination: 28° 44′ 23.45″
- Apparent magnitude (V): 19.06

Characteristics
- Spectral type: DAH

Astrometry
Proper motion (μ)	RA: −1.097 mas/yr Dec.: −7.511 mas/yr
Parallax (π)	1.0071±0.3091 mas
Distance	approx. 3,200 ly (approx. 1,000 pc)

Orbit
Period (P)	12.75344 minutes
Inclination (i)	84.4°

Details

A
Mass	0.26 M_{☉}
Radius	0.0371 R_{☉}
Temperature	16,530 K

B
Mass	0.50 M_{☉}
Radius	0.0142 R_{☉}
Temperature	8,700 K

Other designations
- SDSS J065133.338+284423.37, SDSS J0651, J0651, SDSS J0651+2844, WD+WD J0651+2844

Database references
SIMBAD	data

WD J0651+2844 is a white dwarf binary star system composed of two white dwarfs. They are approximately 120,000 km apart and complete an orbit around their barycenter in less than 13 minutes. This produces an eclipse every 6 minutes. This makes it possible to gather enough data to produce extremely accurate predictions of each future eclipse. The eclipse times deviate from the time predicted in a way consistent with gravitational waves.
