= John McCowan =

John McCowan (4 February 1863 – 24 November 1900) was a Scottish physicist born in Bridge of Allan, near Stirling, Scotland, to tailor William McCowan and his wife Mary McKay. He was educated at the University of Glasgow (B.Sc. 1883, M.A 1886, D.Sc. 1892). He taught first at the Royal College of Science for Ireland (in Dublin) from 1884 to 1888, and from then on at University College, Dundee. McCowan was a pioneer in the study of the fluid mechanics and physics behind surfing, and his papers on wave theory are still being cited over a century later. His career was cut short due to heart issues, and he died at age 37.

== Scientific publications ==
- J. McCowan, On the solitary wave, Philosophical Magazine, Vol. 32, pp. 45–58 (1891).
- J. McCowan, On the highest wave of permanent type, Philosophical Magazine, Vol. 38, pp. 351–358 (1894).
