= Journal of Theoretical and Computational Acoustics =

- Discipline: Acoustics
- Language: English
- Edited by: Sean F. Wu

Publication details
- Former name: Journal of Computational Acoustics
- History: 1993-present
- Publisher: World Scientific (Singapore)
- Impact factor: 1.171 (2021)

Standard abbreviations
- ISO 4: J. Theor. Comput. Acoust.

Indexing
- ISSN: 0218-396X (print); 1793-6489 (web)

Links
- Journal homepage

The Journal of Theoretical and Computational Acoustics is a triannual scientific journal in the field of computational acoustics, covering ocean, seismo- and aeroacoustics, as well as computational methods and supercomputing. It was established in 1993 as the Journal of Computational Acoustics and is published by World Scientific Publishing. It obtained its current name in 2018.

== Abstracting and indexing ==
The journal is abstracted and indexed in:

- Science Citation Index
- CompuMath Citation Index
- Current Contents/Engineering, Computing, and Technology
- Mathematical Reviews
- Inspec
- CSA Aquatic Sciences and Fisheries Abstracts (ASFA)
- CSA Oceanic Abstracts
- CSA Selected Water Resources Abstracts
- CSA Meteorological & Geoastrophysical Abstracts
- Zentralblatt MATH
