= Jeremy Whitlock =

Canadian physicist (born 1965)

Jeremy J. Whitlock (born September 15, 1965) is a section head in the Dept. of Safeguards at the International Atomic Energy Agency in Vienna. He has a Ph.D. in engineering physics from McMaster University and formerly worked at Canadian Nuclear Laboratories.

He was past president and director of the Canadian Nuclear Society (CNS) and a past board member of the American Nuclear Society.
