= Journal of Nanoscience and Nanotechnology =

- Discipline: Nanoscience, nanotechnology
- Language: English
- Edited by: Hari Singh Nalwa

Publication details
- History: 2001–2021
- Publisher: American Scientific Publishers
- Frequency: Monthly
- Impact factor: 1.134 (2019)

Standard abbreviations
- ISO 4: J. Nanosci. Nanotechnol.

Indexing
- CODEN: JNNOAR
- ISSN: 1533-4880
- LCCN: 2001214416
- OCLC no.: 45763374

Links
- Journal homepage; Online access

The Journal of Nanoscience and Nanotechnology was published by American Scientific Publishers, a company identified as a predatory publisher on Beall's List. It was delisted from the Science Citation Index Expanded in the 2019 index, after having received an expression of concern a year earlier.

The journal published all aspects of nanoscale science and technology dealing with materials synthesis, processing, nanofabrication, nanoprobes, spectroscopy, properties, biological systems, nanostructures, theory and computation, nanoelectronics, nano-optics, nano-mechanics, nanodevices, nanobiotechnology, nanomedicine, nanotoxicology. It was discontinued in 2021.
