= John Papaloizou =

British theoretical physicist

- Born: 1947 (age 78–79)
- Education: Queen Mary, University of London; University of Sussex
- Scientific career
- Fields: Astronomy, Theoretical Physics and Applied Mathematics
- Workplaces: University of Cambridge

John Christopher Baillie Papaloizou FRS (born 1947) is a British theoretical physicist. Papaloizou is a professor at the Department of Applied Mathematics and Theoretical Physics (DAMTP) at the University of Cambridge. He works on the theory of accretion disks, with particular application to the formation of planets. He received his DPhil in 1972 from the University of Sussex under the supervision of Roger J. Tayler. The title of his thesis is The Vibrational Instability in Massive Stars.

He discovered the Papaloizou-Pringle instability together with Jim Pringle in 1984. Papaloizou also made major contributions in various areas such as the radial-orbit instability, toroidal modes in stars and different instabilities in accretion disks.

The asteroid 17063 Papaloizou is named after John Papaloizou.

== Awards ==
2003 Fellow of the Royal Society
