= John Hartnett (physicist) =

Australian physicist

John Gideon Hartnett
- Born: 24 March 1952 (age 74); Manjimup, Western Australia
- Education: School of Physics at the University of Western Australia, BSc (Hons) and PhD
- Alma mater: University of Western Australia
- Occupation: Physicist
- Employer(s): University of Adelaide, Adelaide, South Australia
- Known for: Creationist cosmologies
- Awards: Hartnett was announced as the winner of the 2010 W.G. Cady award by IEEE Ultrasonics, Ferroelectrics and Frequency Control Society.

John G. Hartnett (born 24 March 1953 in Manjimup, Western Australia), is an Australian young Earth creationist and cosmologist. He has been active with Creation Ministries International and is known for his opposition to the Big Bang theory and criticism of the dark matter and dark energy hypotheses.

He received both his BSc (Hons) (1973) and PhD with distinction (2001) from the School of Physics at the University of Western Australia (UWA). He currently works as a Research Fellow at the University of Adelaide, South Australia. He has published more than 200 papers in scientific journals, book chapters and conference proceedings, holds one patent, works on the development of ultra-stable cryocooled sapphire oscillators and participated on a Sapphire Clock Ensemble project (Atomic Clock Ensemble in Space Mission) run by the European Space Agency. He also has written articles for several creationist journals and, according to Creation Ministries International, Hartnett "believes that God is the real creator of the universe as the Bible says."

== Research interests ==
His research interests include ultra low-noise radar and ultra high stability cryogenic microwave oscillators and clocks based on a pure single-crystal sapphire resonators. Applications for the latter are to provide low noise local oscillators to atomic physics labs, time and frequency atomic fountain standards, and very high frequency VLBI (Very-Long-Baseline-Interferometry) radio-astronomy. The terrestrial clock technology co-developed by him is claimed to be the most stable in the universe, with Hartnett et al. stating that it outperformed the stability of signals generated by pulsars (rotating neutron stars that produce highly periodic bursts of radio waves; such astronomical sources are then used as natural clocks e.g. for tests of physics). Further on, he is interested in the development of cryocooled CSO resonators, detection of WISPs using low noise microwave techniques, tests of the fundamental theories of physics, such as special and general relativity, measurement of drift in fundamental constants and their cosmological implications and cosmology and the large scale structure of the universe. He is also part of a team of scientists who are building liquid helium-cooled oscillators used by sapphire clocks for the National Metrology Institute of Japan in Tsukuba, Japan.

According to Moshe Carmeli, Professor of Theoretical Physics at Ben Gurion University in Beer Sheva, Israel, Hartnett asserted in his theory that there is no need to assume the existence of dark matter in the universe.

== Publications ==
John Hartnett is the author of the book "Starlight, Time and the New Physics" (2007). and co-author of the book "Dismantling the Big Bang".

- Hartnett, J.G. (June 2006). "The distance modulus determined from Carmeli's cosmology fits the accelerating universe data of the high-redshift type Ia supernovae without dark matter". Foundations of Physics. 36 (6): 839–861. arXiv:astro-ph/0501526. Bibcode:2006FoPh...36..839H. doi:10.1007/s10701-006-9047-y. S2CID 119334725.
- Hartnett, J.G. (November 2006). "Spiral galaxy rotation curves determined from Carmelian general relativity". Int. J. Theor. Phys. 45 (11): 2118–2136. arXiv:astro-ph/0511756. Bibcode:2006IJTP...45.2118H. doi:10.1007/s10773-006-9178-0. S2CID 5242732.
- Hartnett, J.G.; Tobar, M.E. (November 2006). "Properties of gravitational waves in Cosmological general relativity". Int. J. Theor. Phys. 905 (11): 2181–2190. arXiv:gr-qc/0603067. Bibcode:2006IJTP...45.2181H. doi:10.1063/1.2736982. S2CID 6475708.
- Hartnett, J.G.; Oliveira, F.J. (18 March 2006). "Carmeli's cosmology fits data for an accelerating and decelerating universe without dark matter or dark energy". Found. Phys. Lett. 19 (6): 519–535. arXiv:astro-ph/0603500. Bibcode:2006FoPhL..19..519O. doi:10.1007/s10702-006-1007-4. S2CID 14967103.
- Hartnett, J.G.; Oliveira, F.J. (2007). "Luminosity distance, angular size and surface brightness in Cosmological General Relativity". Found. Phys. 37 (3): 446–454. Bibcode:2007FoPh...37..446H. doi:10.1007/s10701-007-9108-x. S2CID 120756047.
- Hartnett, J.G. (2008). "Spheroidal and elliptical galaxy radial velocity dispersion determined from Cosmological General Relativity". Int. J. Theor. Phys. 47 (5): 1252–1260. arXiv:0707.2858. Bibcode:2008IJTP...47.1252H. doi:10.1007/s10773-007-9558-0. S2CID 119683015.
- Hartnett, J.G. (2008). "Extending the redshift-distance relation in Cosmological General Relativity to higher redshifts". Found. Phys. 38 (3): 201–215. arXiv:0705.3097. Bibcode:2008FoPh...38..201H. doi:10.1007/s10701-007-9198-5. S2CID 15943391.
- Hartnett, J.G.; K. Hirano (2008). "Galaxy redshift abundance periodicity from Fourier analysis of number counts N(z) using SDSS and 2dF GRS galaxy surveys". Astrophysics and Space Science. 318 (1–2): 13–24. arXiv:0711.4885. Bibcode:2008Ap&SS.318...13H. doi:10.1007/s10509-008-9906-4. S2CID 16564483.
- Hartnett, J.G. (2013). "A valid finite bounded expanding Carmelian universe without dark matter". International Journal of Theoretical Physics. 52 (12): 4360–4366. arXiv:astro-ph/0508367. Bibcode:2013IJTP...52.4360H. doi:10.1007/s10773-013-1753-6. S2CID 118061478.

== Patents ==
- P1 "Temperature Compensated Oscillator"; US Patent Number 7,046,099, issued 16 May 2006. Obtained from US patent search.

== Bibliography ==
- "VerticalNews Physics. Physics. New findings from University of Western Australia in the area of physics published". VerticalNews.com. 28 April 2008. "...a good fit can be achieved without the need to assume the existence of dark matter. The Carmelian theory is also shown to describe a universe that is always spatially flat."
- Carmelo Amalfi (25 November 2008). "Crisis in cosmology stirs emotional debate. Big bang or bulldust?". ScienceNetwork, Western Australia. "The Alternative Cosmology Group (ACG) meeting...in Geneva, Switzerland...Professor Hartnett says alternative models suggested ranged from a universe with no beginning or end, to one that was static and did not expand, while others were postulated existing inside shells of matter and energy."
- Moshe Carmeli (2008). Relativity: modern large-scale spacetime structure of the cosmos. World Scientific. ISBN 978-981-281-375-6. (46 search results for "Hartnett")
- Kaiser, David (1 November 2007). "The other evolution wars: creationists have long battled with geologists and biologists, but they have only lately taken on physicists and cosmologists.(Essay)". American Scientist. 95 (6): 518. doi:10.1511/2007.68.3700. "...dozens of new 'authoritative' texts to turn to. Books...including...Alex Williams and John Hartnett's Dismantling the Big Bang (2005)...advanced degrees in the physical sciences...supported by a robust institutional network..." "David Kaiser is a professor...at the Massachusetts Institute of Technology... His physics research focuses on early-universe cosmology..."
