= Jacques Villain =

French physicist (1934–2022)

Jacques Villain (French: [vilɛ̃]; 13 March 1934 – 12 June 2022) was a French physicist. He received his PhD at the École normale supérieure, did research at the Institut Laue-Langevin in Grenoble, held, from 1984 to 1988, the position of a director at the Jülich Research Centre in Germany, and he was, since 1996, directeur des recherches at the Commissariat à l'énergie atomique. In the year 2000 he was elected as a member of the Académie des sciences.

His main research areas are in Statistical Physics, Solid State Physics, and Surface Science. He is best known for his excellent contributions to the theory of crystal growth, surface dynamics, low-dimensional magnetism, as well as spatially modulated, commensurate and incommensurate structures in solids.

== Career ==
Jacques Villain made his debut as a researcher in 1958 at the CEA Saclay where he remained until 1970, with a break of 27 months for military service and another of 6 months where he was an expert in Yugoslavia for the International Energy Agency Atomic. From 1970 to 1975, he worked as a researcher at the Institut Laue-Langevin in Grenoble, then from 1975 to 1984 at the CEA Grenoble. He then directed a laboratory at the Jülich Research Center in Germany, from 1984 to 1988. He was then research director at CEA Grenoble where he became scientific advisor after his retirement, from 1996 to 2009. Jacques Villain was a long-term visitor at the Institut Laue-Langevin and chief editor of the Proceedings of the Academy of Sciences (Physics).
