= Jindřich Bačkovský =

Czech physicist (1912–2000)

Jindřich Bačkovský (Czech pronunciation: [ˈjɪndr̝ɪx ˈbatʃkofskiː]; May 4, 1912 – 2000) was an eminent Czechoslovak physicist whose work focused on X-ray spectroscopy, the structure of crystals, vacuum techniques, radiometry and the physics of high pressures. Many of his findings are used in industry, especially in the manufacture of semiconductor parts and synthetic diamonds.
