= John Loveday (physicist) =

John Stephen Loveday is an experimental physicist working in high pressure research. He was educated at Coopers School in Chislehurst and at the University of Bristol, from where he took his PhD in Physics. He currently works as a Reader in the School of Physics and Astronomy at the University of Edinburgh, Scotland.

Loveday is considered one of the pioneers of neutron diffraction at high pressure and was a founder member of the Paris–Edinburgh high-pressure neutron diffraction collaboration. His specialism is in techniques for high-pressure neutron scattering and examining the application of these techniques for investigating structures and transitions in planetary ices, hydrates, water and other simple molecular systems. He is the author of more than seventy papers and his work on the behaviour of clathrate hydrates at high pressure and their relevance to models of planetary bodies including Titan was published in Nature and has been highly cited.

In 2004 he helped establish the Centre for Science at Extreme Conditions, where he works with Andrew D. Huxley and Paul Attfield.
