= Jorge Crispim Romão =

Portuguese physicist

Jorge Crispim Romão is a Portuguese theoretical physicist. As of 2016 he is a Senior Professor at Instituto Superior Técnico working in Centro de Física Teórica de Partículas.

His main research areas are supersymmetry, and the physics of neutrinos and the Higgs boson.

Currently, he is teaching the course Quantum Field Theory as part of the MEFT, Mestrado Integrado em Física Tecnológica (English: Integrated Masters in Technological Physics Engineering) curriculum at Instituto Superior Técnico.
