= Joe F. Thompson =

American aerospace engineer

Joe F. Thompson is an American aerospace engineer. Thompson is the William L. Giles Distinguished Professor at the Mississippi State University and Director, DoD Programming Environment & Training Center. He is known for his contributions to the fields of computational fluid dynamics, especially in the area of grid generation. He, with Z. U. A. Warsi and C. Wayne Mastin, wrote the classic book on grid generation titled Numerical Grid Generation: Foundations and Applications.

== Education and career ==
A native of Grenada, Thompson received his Bachelor's degree in Physics in 1961 and his Master's degree in Aerospace Engineering in 1963 from Mississippi State University. He received his Ph.D. in Aerospace Engineering from Georgia Institute of Technology in 1971.

== Honors and awards ==
During his career Thompson has received many prizes and awards, including

- ASEE Southeastern Research Unit Award for Research, 1975
- Outstanding faculty Award, College of Engineering, Mississippi State University, 1998
- HEADWAE Award from Mississippi Legislature, 1989
- Commanders Award for Public Service, Department of the Army, 1992
- AIAA Aerodynamics Award, 1992
- Faculty Achievement Award for Service, Mississippi State University, 1996

Thompson is a Fellow of the American Institute of Aeronautics and Astronautics since 2004. He is also a member of SIAM, the IEEE Computer Society, and the Mississippi Academy of Sciences.

== Books ==
Thompson has authored and edited several books on grid generation:

- Thompson, J. F. (Ed.), Numerical Grid Generation, North-Holland, 1982.
- Thompson, J. F., Warsi, Z. U. A., Mastin, C. W., Numerical Grid Generation: Foundations and Applications, North-Holland, 1985.
- Sengupta, S., Hauser, J., Eisenman, P. R. Thompson, J. F., (Eds.), Numerical Grid Generation in Computational Fluid Dynamics '88, Pineridge Press, 1988.
- Thompson, J. F., Soni, B. K., Weatherhill, N. (Eds.) Handbook for Grid Generation, CRC Press, 1999.
