= Jaroslav Šafránek =

Czech physicist

Jaroslav Šafránek (23 May 1890 in Plzeň – 22 August 1957 in Prague) was a Czech physicist. n the second half of the 1930s, he designed a system for the transmission of visual images by low-line mechanical television, which made the production of an authentic spatial impression of the picture, transmitted on the screen, possible. His discovery was, unfortunately, largely ignored by the Czechoslovak community.
