= John A. Sanderson =

American optician (1908–1998)

- Born: c.1909 Vardaman, Mississippi
- Died: 11 February 1998; Clemson, South Carolina
- Scientific career
- Fields: Physics; Optics
- Institutions: United States Naval Research Laboratory; Optical Society

John Adolph Sanderson (c.1909 – 11 February 1998) was president of the Optical Society of America in 1967. He was the former head of the optics division at Naval Research Labs and the Research and Education Officer for the Optical Society of America.

Born in Vardaman, Mississippi he gained an A.B. in 1928 and an A.M. in 1929 from the University of Mississippi, afterwards working as a teaching fellow at the university teaching physics and astronomy. He then gained a Ph.D in physics, specializing in optics, at Johns Hopkins University, staying on there for two years to teach physics and astronomy. In 1935 he transferred to the United States Naval Research Laboratory where he worked on a number of optical issues and projects. As superintendent of the Optics Division from 1950 he was involved in the optical measurement of nuclear explosions.

He was inducted as a Fellow of the American Physical Society in 1953. From 1965 to his retirement in 1971 he served on the board of the Optical Society.

He died at the age of 89 in Clemson, South Carolina in 1998. He had been married to Elizabeth and had at least one daughter.

== See also ==
- Optical Society of America#Past Presidents of the OSA
