= John Markert (physicist) =

John T. Markert
- Born: 1957 (age 68–69); New York City
- Education: Bowdoin College; Cornell University
- Occupations: Professor; Physicist

John T. Markert is a professor in The University of Texas at Austin physics department and was department chair from 2005 to 2009. His group has done extensive research on high temperature superconducting materials, high-q oscillator experiments, dynamics of ferromagnets, nuclear magnetic resonance microscopy and spectroscopy, and optically switchable metal hydride films. A textbook written by Dr. Markert and Hans Ohanian, Physics for Engineers and Scientists, was released in 2008 by Norton Publishers. The book is for a calculus-based introductory course. As of 2008 his H (Hirsch number) index is 30..

Markert was born in the Bronx in 1957, the youngest of seven. He attended Regis High School, an all male, all scholarship Jesuit high school. Afterward, he did his undergraduate study at Bowdoin College in Brunswick, Maine. He received his graduate degree at Cornell University in Ithaca, New York, and did post-graduate work at the University of California, San Diego under Brian Maple. He was shortly afterward recruited by UT Austin to be an assistant professor in 1990.
