= List of materials science journals =

This is a list of scientific journals in materials science.

- ACS Applied Materials & Interfaces
- Acta Crystallographica
- Acta Materialia
  - Acta Metallurgica
  - Scripta Materialia
- Advanced Composite Materials
- Advanced Materials
  - Advanced Energy Materials
  - Advanced Engineering Materials
  - Advanced Functional Materials
  - Advanced Optical Materials
- Annual Review of Materials Research
- APL Materials
- Bulletin of Materials Science
- Carbon
- Chemistry of Materials
- Computational Materials Science
- Crystal Growth & Design
- Crystallography Reviews
- Functional Materials
- Functional Materials Letters
- Fibre Chemistry
- International Journal of Damage Mechanics
- JOM (journal)
- Journal of the American Ceramic Society
- Journal of Applied Crystallography
- Journal of Colloid and Interface Science
- Journal of Composite Materials
- Journal of Crystal Growth
- Journal of Elastomers and Plastics
- Journal of Electronic Materials
- Journal of the European Ceramic Society
- Journal of Functional Biomaterials
- Journal of Industrial Textiles
- Journal of Intelligent Material Systems and Structures
- Journal of Materials Chemistry - A, B, and C
- Journal of Materials Processing Technology
- Journal of Materials Research
- Journal of Materials Research and Technology
- Journal of Materials Science
  - Journal of Materials Science Letters
  - Journal of Materials Science: Materials in Electronics
  - Journal of Materials Science: Materials in Medicine
- Journal of Nuclear Materials
- Journal of Plastic Film and Sheeting
- Journal of Physical Chemistry B
- Journal of Thermoplastic Composite Materials
- Macromolecular Chemistry and Physics
  - Macromolecular Materials and Engineering
  - Macromolecular Rapid Communications
  - Macromolecular Reaction Engineering
  - Macromolecular Theory and Simulations
- Materials
- Materials and Structures
- Materials Chemistry and Physics
- Materials Horizons
- Materials Research Letters
- Materials Science and Engineering - A, B, C, and R
- Materials Today
  - Applied Materials Today
  - Materials Today Chemistry
  - Materials Today Energy
  - Materials Today Physics
  - Materials Today Nano
  - Materials Today Sustainability
  - Materials Today Communications
  - Materials Today: Proceedings
- Mechanics of Advanced Composite Structures
- Metallurgical and Materials Transactions
- Metamaterials
- Modelling and Simulation in Materials Science and Engineering
- MRS Advances
- MRS Bulletin
- MRS Communications
- MRS Energy & Sustainability
- Nature Materials
  - Nature Reviews Materials
- Physical Review B
- Progress in Materials Science
- Progress in Polymer Science
- Science and Technology of Advanced Materials
- Sensors and Materials
- Structural and Multidisciplinary Optimization
- Synthetic Metals

== Biomaterials ==
- Acta Biomaterialia
- Biofabrication
- Biomacromolecules
- Biomaterials
- Dental Materials
- Journal of Bioactive and Compatible Polymers
- Journal of Biomaterials Applications
- Journal of Biomedical Materials Research
- Macromolecular Bioscience

== Nanomaterials ==
- ACS Nano
- Applied Nanoscience
- Beilstein Journal of Nanotechnology
- Nano
- Nano Research
- Nano Today
- Nanoscale
- Nature Nanotechnology
- Nano Letters
- Nanoscale Horizon
- Nano Energy
- Small
  - Small Methods

== See also ==
- List of scientific journals
- List of fluid mechanics journals
- List of materials science software
- List of physics journals
