= List of textile science journals =

This is a list of notable academic and scientific journals in textile science, covering various areas including textile technology, materials science, and home economics and industrial applications.

Established in 1982, Clothing & Textiles Research Journal became the most frequent publisher of American clothing and textiles research starting in the 1990s.

== List ==
- Clothing & Textiles Research Journal
- Family and Consumer Sciences Research Journal
- Fibre Chemistry
- Geotextiles and Geomembranes
- International Journal of Textile Science
- Journal of Industrial Textiles
- The Journal of the Textile Institute
- Proceedings of Higher Education Institutions. Textile Industry Technology
- Textile Research Journal
