= Maria Zaharescu =

Romanian chemist

- Born: 1938 (age 87–88); Cluj, Kingdom of Romania
- Education: Babeș-Bolyai University, Faculty of Chemistry, Cluj-Napoca
- Awards: Order of the Star of Romania, Knight rank
- Scientific career
- Fields: Physical chemistry of oxide systems
- Workplaces: Ilie Murgulescu Institute of Physical Chemistry, Bucharest, Romania

Maria-Magdalena Zaharescu (born 1938) is a Romanian chemist, specializing in the physical chemistry of oxide systems.

Zaharescu was a Senior Researcher and Head of Department at the Ilie Murgulescu Institute of Physical Chemistry of the Romanian Academy in Bucharest. In 2001, she was elected a corresponding member of the Romanian Academy and became a full member in June 2015. On December 1, 2017, she was awarded a Knight of the Order of the Star of Romania.

She was one of the 100 women scientists featured in "Successful Women Ceramic and Glass Scientists and Engineers: 100 Inspirational Profiles" by Lynnette Madsen (2016).

== Scientific interests ==
Her scientific interests include:

- Physical chemistry of oxide systems (reactions mechanisms, thermal phase equilibria, structure-properties correlations).
- Sol-gel science (sol-gel chemistry, nanostructured oxide films and powders, inorganic-organic hybrids, nanocomposites, oxide nanotubes). She introduced and developed the field of sol-gel research in Romania.
- Vitreous oxide systems with special properties (thermally and chemically stable)

== Education ==
She graduated from the Babeș-Bolyai University, Faculty of Chemistry, and received her PhD from the Institute of Chemistry, both in Cluj-Napoca.

== Scientific activity ==
- More than 350 scientific papers from which over 250 published in internationally recognized ISI journals, including Journal of Sol-Gel Science and Technology; Journal of the European Ceramic Society; Journal of the American Ceramic Society; Journal of Materials Chemistry; Journal of Materials Science; Journal of Materials Research; Materials Chemistry and Physics; Journal of Non-Crystalline Solids; Journal of Thermal Analysis and Calorimetry; Applied Surface Science; Journal of Nanoparticle Research; Ceramics International; Thin Solid Films; Revue Roumaine de Chimie, etc. as well as 3 patents and 8 book chapters edited by the Romanian Academy and international publishers.
- In 2016, Zaharescu published 1D Oxide Nanostructures Obtained by Sol-Gel and Hydrothermal Methods, as part of the SpringerBriefs series offered by the Springer Publishing Company.
- International research projects in collaboration with Davis University, USA (funded by NST-USA), National Technical University of Athens, Greece (funded by NATO) and universities from Czech Republic, Bulgaria, France, Slovenia
- Member of the International Society of Sol-Gel Science
- Member of the American Ceramic Society – Basic Research Division
- Member of the American Nano Society
- Member of the editorial board of the Journal of Sol-Gel Science and Technology.

== Awards ==
- 1971 - Gheorghe Spacu Award, Romanian Academy
- 1982 - Scientific Merit Medal, Romania
- 1983 - Scientific Order Third Degree, Romania
- 2007 - Honor Award and Gheorghe Spacu Medal, Romanian Society of Chemistry
- 2017 - Knight of the Order of the Star of Romania
