= Macromolecular Rapid Communications =

- Discipline: Polymer science
- Language: English
- Edited by: Bo Weng

Publication details
- History: 1979-present
- Publisher: Wiley-VCH
- Frequency: Biweekly
- Open access: Hybrid
- Impact factor: 5.734 (2020)

Standard abbreviations
- ISO 4: Macromol. Rapid Commun.

Indexing
- CODEN: MRCOE3
- ISSN: 1022-1336 (print); 1521-3927 (web)

Links
- Journal homepage; Online access; Online archive

Macromolecular Rapid Communications is a biweekly peer-reviewed scientific journal covering polymer science. It publishes Communications, Feature Articles and Reviews on general polymer science, from chemistry and physics of polymers to polymers in materials science and life sciences.

== History ==
The journal was founded in 1979 as a supplement to the first journal in the field of polymer science, the Journal für Makromolekulare Chemie (Journal for Macromolecular Chemistry) as a forum for the rapid publication of the newest and most exciting developments in the field of polymer science. According to the Journal Citation Reports, the journal has a 2020 impact factor of 5.734. The editorial office is in Weinheim, Germany.

== See also ==
- Macromolecular Chemistry and Physics, 1947
- Macromolecular Theory and Simulations, 1992
- Macromolecular Materials and Engineering, 2000
- Macromolecular Bioscience, 2001
- Macromolecular Reaction Engineering, 2007
