= Macromolecular Chemistry and Physics =

- Discipline: Polymer science
- Language: English
- Edited by: Mara Staffilani

Publication details
- Former name(s): Die Makromolekulare Chemie; Macromolecular Chemistry
- History: 1947-present
- Publisher: Wiley-VCH
- Frequency: Biweekly
- Open access: Hybrid
- Impact factor: 2.996 (2021)

Standard abbreviations
- ISO 4: Macromol. Chem. Phys.

Indexing
- CODEN: MCHPES
- ISSN: 1022-1352 (print); 1521-3935 (web)
- LCCN: 94652062
- OCLC no.: 231476857

Links
- Journal homepage; Online access; Online links

Macromolecular Chemistry and Physics is a biweekly peer-reviewed scientific journal covering polymer science. It publishes full papers, talents, trends, and highlights in all areas of polymer science, from chemistry to physical chemistry, physics, and materials science.

== History ==
Macromolecular Chemistry and Physics was established in 1947 as Die Makromolekulare Chemie/Macromolecular Chemistry by Hermann Staudinger and obtained its current title in 1994. According to the Journal Citation Reports, the journal has a 2021 impact factor of 2.996.

== See also ==
- Macromolecular Rapid Communications, 1979
- Macromolecular Theory and Simulations, 1992
- Macromolecular Materials and Engineering, 2000
- Macromolecular Bioscience, 2001
- Macromolecular Reaction Engineering, 2007
