= Biswa Ranjan Nag =

Indian physicist (1932–2004)

- Born: 1 October 1932; Comilla, Chittagong Division, British India
- Died: 6 April 2004 (aged 71); Kolkata, West Bengal, India
- Education: Presidency College; Rajabazar Science College; University of Calcutta; University of Wisconsin
- Known for: Studies on semiconductors
- Awards: 1964 BIRE J. C. Bose Memorial Prize; 1974 Shanti Swarup Bhatnagar Prize; 1993 INSA Materials Science Prize
- Scientific career
- Fields: Semiconductor physics
- Workplaces: University of Calcutta
- Doctoral advisor: Arun K. Choudhury

Biswa Ranjan Nag (1 October 1932 – 6 April 2004) was an Indian physicist and the Sisir Kumar Mitra chair professor at Rajabazar Science College, University of Calcutta. Known for his research in semiconductor physics, Nag was an elected fellow of the Indian National Science Academy and Indian Academy of Sciences. The Council of Scientific and Industrial Research, the apex agency of the Government of India for scientific research, awarded him the Shanti Swarup Bhatnagar Prize for Science and Technology, one of the highest Indian science awards for his contributions to Physical Sciences in 1974. (Note: Long link – please select award year to see details)

== Biography ==
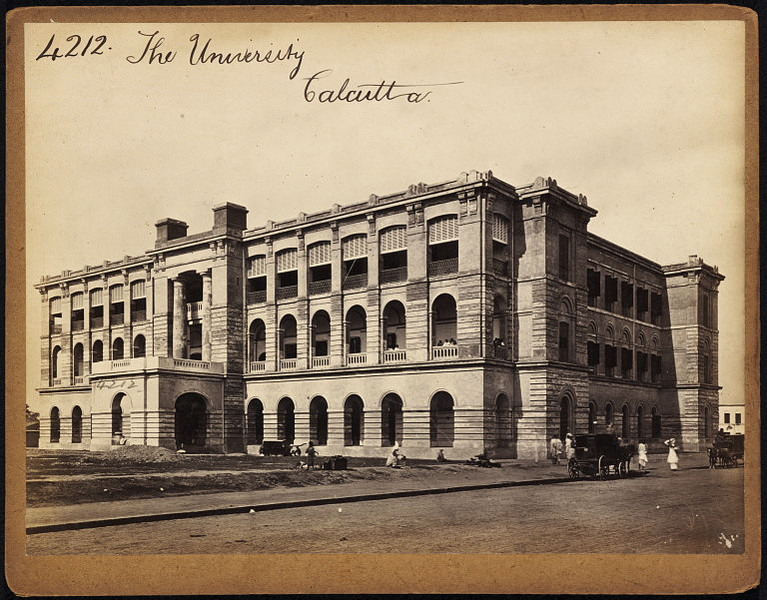
Nag completed his master's degree and served as faculty in the University of Calcutta's Institute of Radiophysics and Electronics (IRE).

Born on 1 October 1932 to Sailabala and Satyaranjan Nag at Comilla, a city along the Dhaka-Chittagong Highway in the undivided Bengal of the British India (presently in Bangladesh), B. R. Nag did his graduate studies at Presidency College, Calcutta, during 1949–51 and earned a master's degree in technology (M.Tech.) from the Institute of Radiophysics and Electronics (IRE) at the Rajabazar Science College campus of the University of Calcutta in 1954. He started his career in 1956 as a faculty member at IRE and simultaneously pursued doctoral studies, mentored by Arun K. Choudhury. In between, he spent one year at the University of Wisconsin, obtaining an MS in 1959. Mr. Nag returned to Calcutta to resume his doctoral work, and earned his PhD in 1961. Continuing his teaching career, he became a full professor in 1968. Further research earned him a Doctor of Science degree from Calcutta University in 1972. He served out his regular academic career at the university and continued his association past his superannuation in 1997 as its Sisir Kumar Mitra professor. In between, he also served as a Commonwealth visiting professor at Bangor, Gwynedd.

Nag was married to Mridula Roy Choudhury, and the couple had two children, Biswadeep and Mriduchanda. He died on 6 April 2004 in Kolkata, at the age of 71.

== Legacy ==
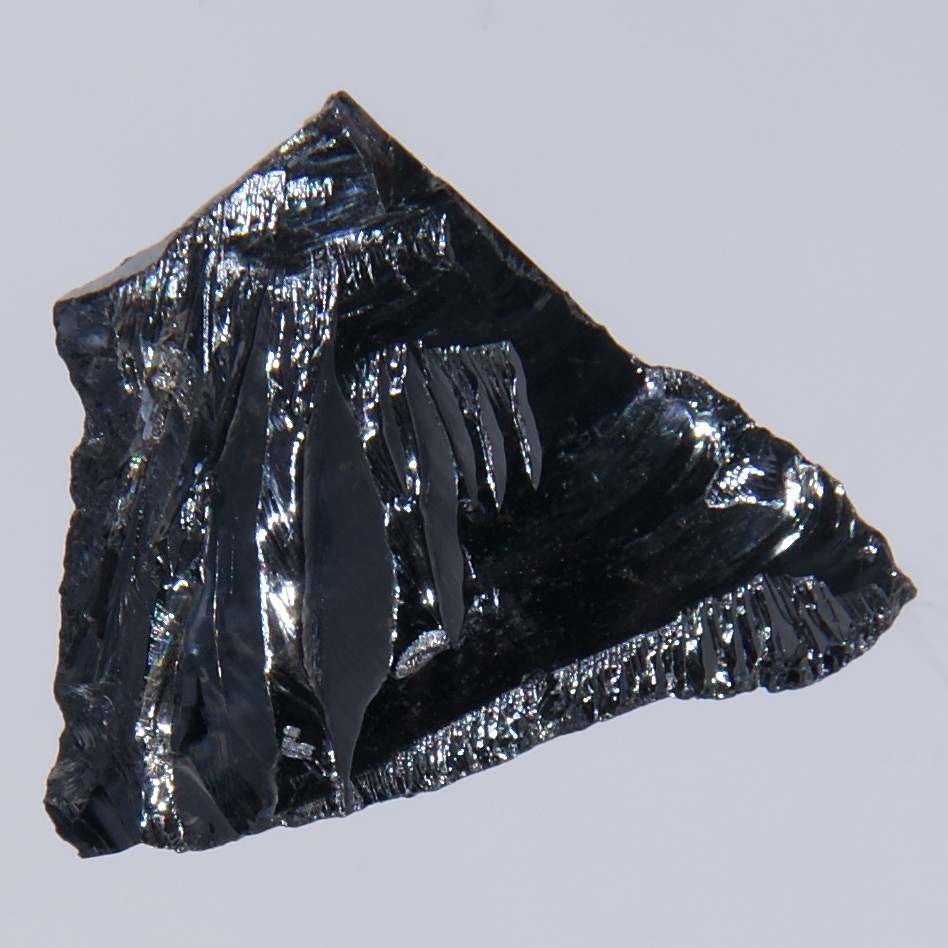
Silicon crystals, a common semiconducting material

Nag's work focused on semiconductors, and it helped in widening our understanding of the electrical transport phenomena in those high electrical resistant solids. During his early years at Calcutta University, he led a group of students who were engaged in the studies on microwave measurements of semiconductor properties and did advanced research on Gunn effect and microwave radiation. He demonstrated the temperature independence of two-dimensional electron gas and its alloy scattering limited mobility which was a first time discovery. His studies revealed the non-parabolic nature of electron energy dispersion in narrow quantum wells, and this modified the theory of interface roughness scattering limited mobility for Quantum Wells with finite barrier height and Well width. Liquid phase Epitaxy Semiconducting III–V compounds, acousto-electric effect and free carrier absorption, Gini ratio and Si coefficient related to hot-electron galvanomagnetic transport were some of the other areas of his research. He contributed to the development of electron transport theory related to semiconductors and developed a Monte Carlo method for the computation of coefficients related to velocity correlation, diffusion and noise parameters. His body of work is reported to have relevance to the fields of microwave communications and radar, especially in the development of microwave semiconductor devices. His studies have been documented by way of a number of articles (Note: Please see Selected bibliography section) and the article repository of the Indian Academy of Sciences has listed 190 of them. He authored three monographs, Theory of electrical transport in semiconductors, Physics of Quantum Well Devices and Electron Transport in Compound Semiconductors of which the last mentioned is reported to be a significant reference text for researchers. He also contributed chapters to books published by others and his work has drawn citations in a number of books.

== Awards and honors ==
Nag, a founder fellow of the Indian National Academy of Engineering, received the J. C. Bose Memorial Prize of the British Institution of Radio Engineers in 1964. The Council of Scientific and Industrial Research awarded him the Shanti Swarup Bhatnagar Prize, one of the highest Indian science awards, in 1974. He was selected for the Jawaharlal Nehru Fellowship in 1975, and the Indian National Science Academy elected him as a fellow in 1978; the academy would honor him again in 1993 with the INSA Prize for Materials Science. He became an elected fellow of the Indian Academy of Sciences. The department of radio physics and electronics of the University of Calcutta instituted an annual conference, International Conference on Computers and devices for Communication (CODEC), in his honor in 1998, a year after Nag retired from academic service.

== Selected bibliography ==
=== Books ===
- B. R. Nag (1972). Theory of electrical transport in semiconductors. Pergamon Press. ISBN 9780080168029.
- B.R. Nag (11 April 2006). Physics of Quantum Well Devices. Springer Science & Business Media. ISBN 978-0-306-47127-8.

B.R. Nag (6 December 2012). Electron Transport in Compound Semiconductors. Springer Science & Business Media. ISBN 978-3-642-81416-7.

=== Chapters ===
- Institution of Engineers (India). Metallurgy & Material Science Division (1967). Journal of the Institution of Engineers (India). Part MM, Mining & Metallurgy Division. The Institution.
- Institution of Engineers (India) (July 1968). Journal of the Institution of Engineers (India). The Institution.
- K. Lal (2 December 2012). Synthesis, Crystal Growth and Characterization. Elsevier Science. pp. 426–. ISBN 978-0-08-098469-8.

=== Articles ===
- P. K. Basu, B. R. Nag (1984). "Alloy scattering limited mobility of two-dimensional electron gas formed in In0.53Ga0.47As". Surface Science. 142 (1–3): 256–259. Bibcode:1984SurSc.142..256B. doi:10.1016/0039-6028(84)90317-0.
- B. R. Nag, Sanghamitra Mukhopadhyay (1992). "Polar Optic Phonon Scattering Limited-Mobility in Narrow Quantum Wells". Japanese Journal of Applied Physics. 31 (3287): 3287–3291. Bibcode:1992JaJAP..31.3287N. doi:10.1143/JJAP.31.3287. S2CID 250814573.
- B. R. Nag (1994). "Ga0.47 In0.53 As—The material for high-speed devices". Pramana. 23 (3): 411–421. Bibcode:1984Prama..23..411N. doi:10.1007/BF02846585. S2CID 118182971.
- Nag, B. R. (1997). "An empirical relation between the melting point and the direct bandgap of semiconducting compounds". Journal of Electronic Materials. 26 (2): 70–72. Bibcode:1997JEMat..26...70N. doi:10.1007/s11664-997-0090-z. S2CID 59477276.
- K. P. Ghatak, B. R. Nag (1998). "A simple theoretical analysis of the Einstein relation in ultrathin films of bismuth under quantizing magnetic field". Journal of Physics and Chemistry of Solids. 59 (3): 411–415. Bibcode:1998JPCS...59..411G. doi:10.1016/S0022-3697(97)00196-0.
- B. R. Nag, Madhumita Das (2001). "Scattering potential for interface roughness scattering". Applied Surface Science. 182 (3–4): 357–360. Bibcode:2001ApSS..182..357N. doi:10.1016/S0169-4332(01)00448-2.
- B. R. Nag (2004). "Electron mobility in indium nitride". Journal of Crystal Growth. 269 (1): 35–40. Bibcode:2004JCrGr.269...35N. doi:10.1016/j.jcrysgro.2004.05.031.

== See also ==
- Phonon
- List of semiconductor materials
- Einstein relation (kinetic theory)
- Electron mobility
