= David N. Seidman =

American materials scientist

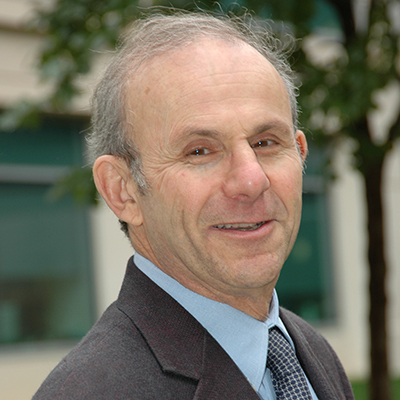
- Born: David Nathaniel Seidman; July 5, 1938 (age 88); Brooklyn, New York
- Education: University of Illinois Urbana-Champaign, New York University
- Known for: his groundbreaking contributions to atom-probe tomography and atomic-scale characterization of materials
- Spouse: Shoshanah Seidman
- Awards: Distinguished Scientist Award in Physical Sciences (Microscopy Society of America, 2020) Gold Medal (ASM International, 2019) Robert Franklin Mehl Medal (TMS, 2011) David Turnbull Lecturer Award (Materials Research Society, 2008) Albert Sauveur Achievement Award (ASM International, 2006) Max Planck Research Prize, jointly awarded with Professor Peter Haasen (1993) Alexander von Humboldt Stiftung Prize (1989, 1992) Robert Lansing Hardy Gold Medal (TMS, 1966)
- Scientific career
- Fields: Materials Science and Engineering, Physics, Physical Metallurgy
- Workplaces: Northwestern University
- Thesis: Sources of Thermally Generated Vacancies in Single-Crystal and Polycrystalline Gold (1965)
- Doctoral advisor: Robert W. Balluffi
- Website: https://www.mccormick.northwestern.edu/research-faculty/directory/profiles/seidman-david.html

David N. Seidman is an American materials scientist known for his work in atom-probe tomography and atomic-scale characterization of materials. He holds the title of Walter P. Murphy Professor Emeritus of Materials Science and Engineering at Northwestern University and is the founding and current director of the Northwestern University Center for Atom-Probe Tomography (NUCAPT).

== Early life and education ==
Seidman was born in Brooklyn, New York, in 1938 to Charles Seidman (1906-2002) and Jeannette Cohen Seidman (1908-2003). He attended Brooklyn Technical High School, graduating with honors in 1956. Seidman earned his Bachelor of Science in Physical Metallurgy and Physics from New York University in 1960 and his Master of Science in Physical Metallurgy in 1962. He completed his Ph.D. in Physical Metallurgy and Physics at the University of Illinois Urbana-Champaign in 1965 under the mentorship of Robert W. Balluffi, focusing on atomic defects in metals.

== Academic career ==
Seidman's academic career began at Cornell University, where he served as a professor of materials science and engineering. During his tenure, he initiated the use of field-ion microscopy in January 1966 to study point defects in quenched or irradiated materials. He also constructed the first ultrahigh vacuum atom-probe field-ion microscope that was entirely computer-controlled for high mass resolution, setting the standard for future instrument design

In 1985, Seidman joined Northwestern University as a professor of materials science and engineering. He was appointed the Walter P. Murphy Professor in 1996. At Northwestern, he founded NUCAPT, which has become a leading center for atom-probe tomography research.

== Awards and honors ==
Seidman has been recognized for his contributions to materials science and engineering. In 2018, he was elected to the National Academy of Engineering. He is also a Fellow of numerous organizations, including the American Academy of Arts & Sciences (2010), the American Physical Society (Condensed Matter Physics Division, 1984), ASM International (2005), the Materials Research Society (2010), and TMS (Minerals, Metals & Materials Society, 1997). He is also a Member of the EU Academy of Sciences (EUAS, 2018) and the Böhmische Physical Society. In 2016, he was named to the inaugural class of Fellows of the International Field-Emission Society. Seidman was also a two-time Fellow of the John Simon Guggenheim Foundation (1972–73, 1980–81) and was named an Honorary Member of the American Institute of Mining, Metallurgical, and Petroleum Engineers in 2014. Seidman has received other awards throughout his career, including:

- Robert Lansing Hardy Gold Medal (TMS, 1966)
- Albert Sauveur Achievement Award (ASM International, 2006)
- Gold Medal (ASM International, 2019)
- David Turnbull Lecturer Award (Materials Research Society, 2008)
- Distinguished Scientist Award in Physical Sciences (Microscopy Society of America, 2020)
- Alexander von Humboldt Stiftung Prize (1989, 1992)
- Max Planck Research Prize, jointly awarded with Professor Peter Haasen (1993)
- Robert Franklin Mehl Medal (TMS, 2011)

Additionally, his research from 1968 to 1977 was rated among the top twenty most highly rated major achievements sponsored by the National Science Foundation in materials science, as identified by a MITRE evaluative study of Materials Research Laboratory Programs. He also received the National Science Foundation Creativity Extension Award (2001–2003) and an IBM Faculty Research Award (2010–2011). In February 2009, Seidman was honored with a two-and-a-half-day symposium at the annual TMS meeting in San Francisco, California. From 2011 to 2012, he served as a Sackler Lecturer at the Mortimer and Raymond Sackler Institute of Advanced Studies at Tel Aviv University. In December 2025, Seidman was hosted by the Faculty of Engineering at Tel Aviv University, where he was named an Honorary Fellow of the Faculty of Engineering by university president Professor Ariel Porat.

== Selected work ==
- Z. Mao, C.K. Sudbrack, K.E. Yoon, G. Martin, D.N. Seidman, "The mechanism of morphogenesis in a phase-separating concentrated multicomponent alloy," Nat. Mater. 6(3) (2007) 210–216.
- J.D. Rittner, D.N. Seidman,"<110> symmetric tilt grain-boundary structures in fcc metals with low stacking-fault energies," Physical Review B 54(10) (1996) 6999-7015.
- O.C. Hellman, J.A. Vandenbroucke, J. Rüsing, D. Isheim, D.N. Seidman, "Analysis of Three-dimensional Atom-probe Data by the Proximity Histogram," Microsc. microanal. 6(5) (2000) 437-444.
- E.A. Marquis, D.N. Seidman, "Nanoscale structural evolution of Al_{3}Sc precipitates in Al(Sc) alloys," Acta Materialia 49(11) (2001) 1909-1919.
- K. Biswas, J. He, I.D. Blum, C.-I. Wu, T.P. Hogan, D.N. Seidman, V.P. Dravid, M.G. Kanatzidis, "High-performance bulk thermoelectrics with all-scale hierarchical architectures," Nature 489(7416) (2012) 414–418.
- Y. Amouyal, Z. Mao, D.N. Seidman, "Effects of tantalum on the partitioning of tungsten between the γ- and γ′-phases in nickel-based superalloys: Linking experimental and computational approaches," Acta Materialia 58(18) (2010) 5898–5911.
- A.R. Farkoosh, D.C. Dunand, D.N. Seidman, "Enhanced age-hardening response and creep resistance of an Al-0.5Mn-0.3Si (at.%) alloy by Sn inoculation," Acta Materialia 240 (2022) 118344.
- D.N. Seidman, "Three-Dimensional Atom-Probe Tomography: Advances and Applications," Annual Review of Materials Research 37(1) (2007) 127-158.

== Professional roles ==
Seidman served as editor-in-chief and a member of the editorial boards for journals, including Interface Science, the MRS Bulletin, Materials Today and Materials Research Letters. He was also President of the International Field-Emission Society from 2000 to 2002. He is founder and director of the Northwestern University Center for Atom-Probe Tomography (NUCAPT) and a co-founder of NanoAl LLC, a startup specializing in advanced aluminum alloys, which was later acquired by Braidy Industries. In 2019 he was elected a governor of the Board of Governors of Tel Aviv University. He is also a member of the International Advisory Board of the Department of Materials Science and Engineering at Tel Aviv University. Seidman held several visiting professorships at prominent institutions worldwide, including:

- Technion – Israel Institute of Technology (1969)
- Tel Aviv University (1972, 2008, 2009, 2010)
- Hebrew University (1978)
- Centre d'Études Nucléaires de Grenoble (1981)
- Institut für Metallphysik der Universität Göttingen (1989, 1992)
- Centre d'Études Nucléaires de Saclay (1989)
