= Deborah Chung =

American scientist and university professor

Deborah Chung 鍾端玲 or 黛博拉 • D • L • 钟
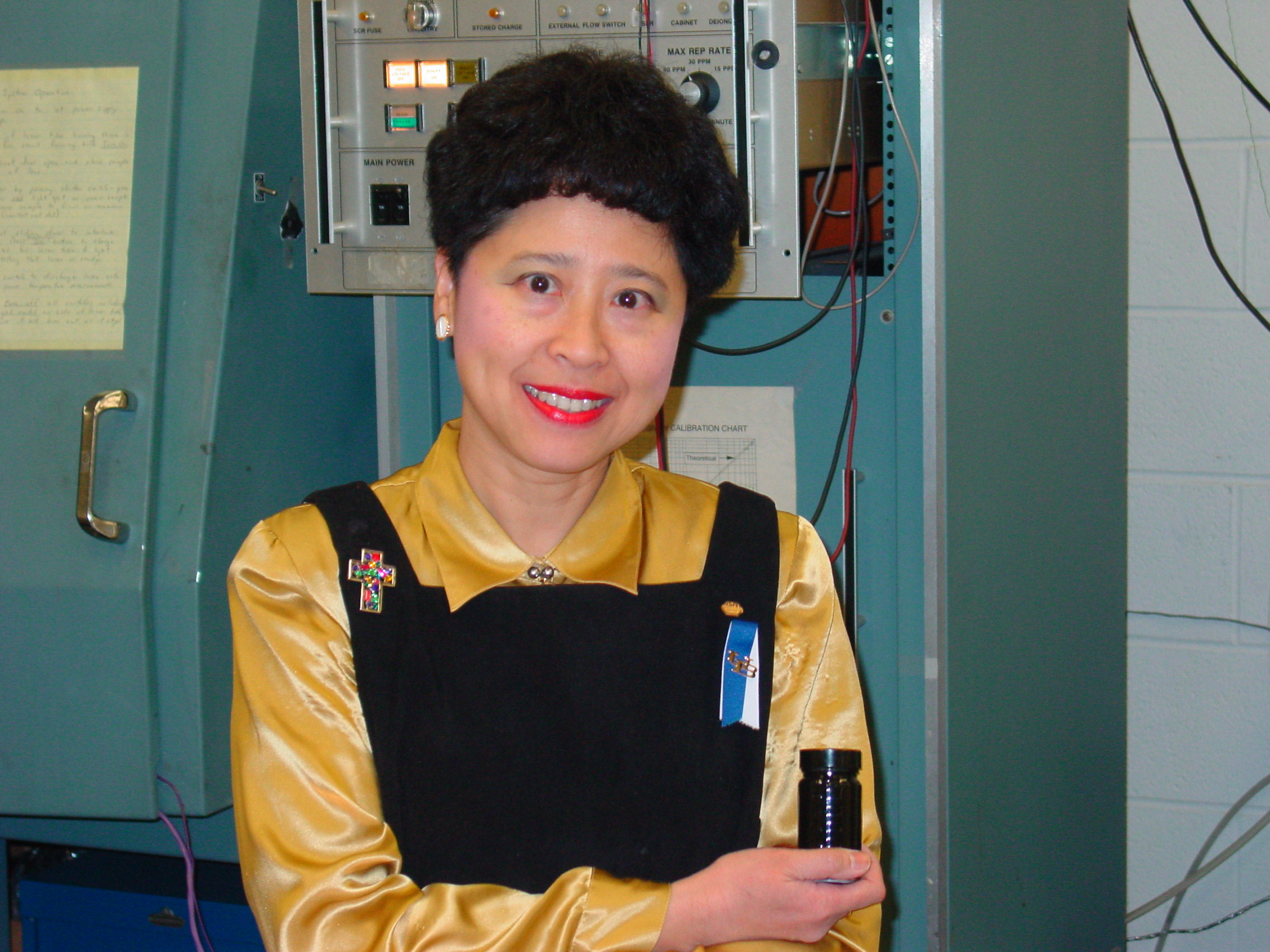
- Born: British Hong Kong
- Citizenship: United States
- Education: California Institute of Technology, Massachusetts Institute of Technology
- Awards: Member of American Academy of Arts and Sciences; Charles E. Pettinos Award; ranked 10th in the world among living materials scientists; U.S. Congressional Special Recognition; Caltech's Distinguished Alumni Award; University at Buffalo President's Medal.
- Scientific career
- Fields: Materials science
- Workplaces: University at Buffalo, The State University of New York; Carnegie Mellon University
- Doctoral advisor: Mildred S. Dresselhaus

Deborah Duen Ling Chung (professionally known as D.D.L. Chung, Chinese: 鍾端玲 or 黛博拉 • D • L • 钟) is an American scientist and university professor.

== Early life and education ==
Chung was born and raised in Hong Kong. Her mother was Rebecca Chan Chung (United States World War II veteran with the Flying Tigers and the United States Army in China), whose mother was Lee Sun Chau (one of the first female doctors of Western Medicine in China).

Chung studied at Ying Wa Girls' School and King's College (Hong Kong). She moved to the United States in 1970 and received a B.S. degree in Engineering and Applied Science and an M.S. degree in Engineering Science from California Institute of Technology (Caltech) in 1973. At Caltech, she conducted research under the supervision of Pol Duwez. She, Sharon R. Long, Flora Wu and Stephanie Charles are the four first women to receive B.S. degrees from California Institute of Technology.

Chung received a Ph.D. degree in materials science from Massachusetts Institute of Technology in 1977. Her thesis, which was on graphite intercalation compounds, was supervised by Mildred S. Dresselhaus.

== Career and awards ==
In 1977, Chung joined the faculty of Carnegie Mellon University, where she taught materials science and electrical engineering.

In 1986, she joined the faculty of University at Buffalo, The State University of New York, where she directs the Composite Materials Research Laboratory and was named Niagara Mohawk Power Corporation Endowed Chair Professor in 1991. She is currently SUNY Distinguished Professor, with SUNY in the title referring to The State University of New York. This is the highest faculty rank in SUNY.

In 1991, Chung became Fellow of the American Carbon Society. In 1998, she became Fellow of ASM International (society). She received the Chancellor's Award for Excellence in Scholarship and Creative Activities from State University of New York in 2003 and was named Outstanding Inventor by State University of New York in 2002. In 1993, she was honored as "Teacher of the Year" by Tau Beta Pi (New York Nu). Chung was the first American woman and the first person of Chinese descent to receive the Charles E. Pettinos Award, in 2004; the award was in recognition of her work on functional carbons for thermal, electromagnetic and sensor applications. In 2005, she received the Hsun Lee Lecture Award from Institute of Metal Research, Chinese Academy of Sciences. In 2011, she received an Honorary Doctorate Degree from University of Alicante, Alicante, Spain. In 2023, Chung was elected as a member of the American Academy of Arts and Sciences in recognition of her significant contributions in engineering and technology. In 2024, Chung received the President's Medal from University at Buffalo, The State University of New York, in recognition of extraordinary service to the university. Chung also received a U.S. Special Congressional Recognition. In 2025, Chung received Caltech's Distinguished Alumni Award. In addition, Chung received the Robert Lansing Hardy Gold Medal from the American Institute of Mining, Metallurgical, and Petroleum Engineers (AIME) in 1980.

== Scientific work ==
=== Scope ===
The main theme of Chung's research is composite materials, with emphasis on multifunctional structural materials, materials for thermal management and electronic packaging, materials for electromagnetic interference shielding, structural materials for vibration damping, and structural materials for thermoelectricity. Chung invented "smart concrete" (concrete that can sense its own condition), nickel nanofiber (also known as nickel filament, for electromagnetic interference shielding) and conformable thermal paste (for improving thermal contacts, with applications in microelectronic cooling). In addition, Chung has discovered giant inductance in coil-less materials. Chung is highly productive in scientific research, with research funding provided mainly by the Federal government of the United States.

=== Books ===
Chung is the author of "Carbon Materials", World Scientific, 2018,Carbon Composites, 2nd Edition, Elsevier, 2016, Functional Materials, World Scientific, 2nd Ed., 2021 and Composite Materials: Science and Applications, 2nd Edition, Springer, 2010. She is the editor of two-book series, The Road to Scientific Success and Engineering Materials for Technological Needs.

=== Professional leadership ===
According to the 2022 Stanford University publication/citation-based ranking of all researchers in the world (living/deceased) for all disciplines, Chung is ranked No. 13 among 315,721 researchers in the world with Materials as the primary discipline; if only the living researchers are counted, Chung is ranked No. 10 in the world; if only women are counted, Chung is ranked No. 1 in the world; if only researchers of Chinese descent are counted, Chung is ranked No. 1 in the world. Among the researchers in University at Buffalo, The State University of New York, for all disciplines combined, Chung is ranked No. 1.

According to the 2026 ranking of scholars in the world, in the discipline of Mechanical Engineering, Chung is ranked #11 (living/deceased), #8 (living ones only) and #1 (females only). In the field of Carbon Fiber, she is ranked #1 (living/deceased). In the field of Electromagnetic Interference, she is ranked #1 (living/deceased).

Chung is among 100 scientists featured in the book Successful Women Ceramic and Glass Scientists and Engineers: 100 Inspirational Profiles. She has been interviewed by the news media concerning various scientific topics including conductive concrete for melting snow, smart concrete, and batteries.

Chung is Executive Guest Editor for the Special Issue on "Amorphous and Nanocrystalline Carbon Films: Development and Applications" of the journal Materials Chemistry and Physics, dedicated to the memory of Professor Mildred Dresselhaus, Associate Editor of the Journal of Electronic Materials, and is a member of the editorial board of the Carbon journal, a member of the editorial board of the New Carbon Materials journal, and an editor of Carbon Letters. She is also a member of the editorial board of Materials Chemistry and Physics journal, "Functional Composite Materials" journal, and "Polymer and Polymer Composites" journal. She also served as the Chair of the 21st Biennial Conference on Carbon held in Buffalo, New York, in 1993. Moreover, she was a member of the Advisory Committee of the American Carbon Society. In addition, Chung serves as a reviewer for a large number of scientific research journals. Recent work at the National Academies includes serving as a member of the Panel on Review of In-house Laboratory Independent Research in Materials Sciences at the Army's Research, Development, and Engineering Centers in 2018–19.

== Historical work ==
Chung is a co-author of the book Piloted to Serve, an autobiography of her mother, Rebecca Chan Chung (1920-2011), a nurse with the Flying Tigers, United States Army and China National Aviation Corporation during World War II. Chung's historical work pertains to modern Chinese history, as centered around her mother Rebecca Chan Chung and grandmother Lee Sun Chau (1890-1979). Chau was one of the earliest Chinese female doctors of Western Medicine in China.
