= Peter Thrower =

American materials scientist

Peter Thrower (born 1938) is a professor emeritus of materials science and engineering at Pennsylvania State University, and a former editor-in-chief of the scientific journal Carbon, a post he has held between 1982 and 2013. A special issue of Carbon was published in his honor in August 2012. He also edited the review journal Chemistry and Physics of Carbon from 1973 to 1998. He is a specialist on carbon in all its forms.

Thrower studied physics at the University of Cambridge. He then took up a position at the Atomic Energy Research Establishment (Harwell, UK) before moving to Pennsylvania State University, where he remained until he retired in 1998.
