= Helen Maynard-Casely =

Australian instrument scientist

Helen Maynard-Casely is an instrument scientist at the Australian Centre for Neutron Scattering at the Australian Nuclear Science and Technology Organisation (ANSTO) in Sydney, Australia. She has won numerous prizes and is an advocate for the participation of women in STEM.

== Education ==
Maynard-Casely obtained her MSc in Planetary Science from University College London in 2005. She received a Doctor of Philosophy in High Pressure Physics from the University of Edinburgh in 2009 for her thesis titled "The new mineralogy of the outer solar system and the high-pressure behaviour of methane".

== Career ==
After completing her studies, Maynard-Casely held a postdoctoral research position at the University of Edinburgh until 2010. She took a position as a Christmas Lecturer's researcher for the Royal Institution of Great Britain before moving to Australia in 2011 to take up a postdoctoral Research Fellowship at the Powder Diffraction Beamline at the Australian Synchrotron. As of October 2022, she is an Instrument Scientist at the Australian Centre for Neutron Scattering.

Her research expertise is in using neutron scattering techniques to investigate the crystal structure of composite molecules commonly detected in planetary ices such as methane, ammonia and water, in order to better understand the composition of icy moons such as Jupiter's Galilean moon Europa and Saturn's largest moon Titan.

Maynard-Casely regularly contributes to various online blogs and news outlets including Cosmos magazine and not-for-profit news publisher The Conversation where she is frequently an advocate for the improved participation of women in STEM fields. She is an editor for the peer-reviewed journal Crystallography Reviews. Her writing was featured in The Best Australian Science Writing 2012 for her piece "Life in Lake Vostok: The link between Antarctica and extraterrestrials". She is also a co-author of children's book "I Heart Pluto" with Chris Ferrie.

== Achievements ==
- 2019 – Australian Institute of Physics (AIP) Women in Physics Lecturer
- 2018 – ANSTO Nuclear Science and Technology Award – Excellence in Science Communication and Outreach
- 2011 – Guinness World record for the longest glow stick necklace, at 326.44m length
- 2010 – Malvern PANalytical Thesis Prize for Physical Crystallography
