= Georges Kipouros =

Georges John Kipouros
- Citizenship: Greek and Canadian
- Education: University of Toronto; National Technical University of Athens
- Scientific career
- Fields: Materials Engineering; Metallurgy
- Workplaces: University of Saskatchewan; Dalhousie University; Massachusetts Institute of Technology

Georges John Kipouros is a Greek Canadian materials engineer, university professor, and former dean of the University of Saskatchewan College of Engineering. He presently serves as adjunct professor at the Faculty of Engineering of both Dalhousie University and University of Waterloo. He is the winner of the 20th Canadian Metal Chemistry Award, and is known as an ambassador for the engineering profession in Canada. At Dalhousie University he served as the vice chair of the Senate, assistant dean of the Faculty of Engineering, director of the Minerals Engineering Centre and head of the Mining and Metallurgical Engineering Department. He is known for his contributions to the processing of aluminum, magnesium, rare earth metals and molten salts, as well as the analysis of corrosion in additive manufacturing. In addition he is known as a major expert in powder metallurgy. He is the inventor of a technique for measuring metal corrosion in active pipelines, allowing for early detection of problem areas. At General Motors, he integrated the recovery and recycling of reactants into the production of neodymium from its oxide, rendering the process more cost-effective. He also led the technology transfer from laboratory research to plant production.

He received a Diploma of Engineering from the National Technical University of Athens, as well as a Master of Applied Science and Ph.D. from the University of Toronto. From 1982-1985 he served as a postdoctoral fellow at the Massachusetts Institute of Technology with Donald Sadoway. He has been a visiting professor at the University of Tokyo, Kyoto University, University of Patras, University of Trondheim and Tohoku University.

For his contributions to scholarship, Kipouros has been elected a Fellow of the Canadian Academy of Engineering, the Canadian Institute of Mining, Metallurgy and Petroleum and the Japan Society for the Promotion of Science. In 2009 he was awarded the title of Distinguished Lecturer by CIM. He has served as an advisor to the Canadian International Development Agency, the NATO Science for Peace and Security programme, and Mehran University of Engineering and Technology.
