= Zaharescu =

Zaharescu is a surname. Notable people with the surname include:

- Alexandru Zaharescu (born 1961), Romanian mathematician
- Maria Zaharescu (born 1938), Romanian chemist
