= Manget =

Manget is a surname. Notable people with the surname include:

- Fred Manget (1880–1979), American medical missionary in China
- Jean-Jacques Manget (1652–1742), Genevan physician and writer
