= Lee Sun Chau =

Chinese doctor

Lee Sun CHAU (seated) with medical college classmate Yuen Hing WONG (standing)

Lee Sun Chau (周理信, i.e., 周六姑, 1890-1979) was one of the first female Chinese doctors of Western Medicine in China.

== Education and medical career ==
Lee Sun Chau was an alumna of Belilios Public School (庇理羅士女子中學). In the late 1910s she graduated from Hackett Medical College for Women (夏葛女子醫學院), and she then worked as a staff physician at the David Gregg Hospital for Women and Children (also known as Yuji Hospital 柔濟醫院, currently 广州医学院第三附属医院) located on Duo Bao Road (多寶路), 广州市荔湾区 Guangzhou, China.

The photo at the right was taken in Guangzhou, China, in the 1910s. It shows Lee Sun Chau (seated) and her classmate Yuen Hing WONG (黃婉卿) (standing). They both attended the Hackett Medical College for Women in Guangzhou, China. Both graduated from the College and practiced Western Medicine in China.

Due to the Warlord Era in China, Lee Sun Chau moved from Guangzhou to Hong Kong in late 1920. There she worked in Hong Kong Sanatorium & Hospital as an anesthesiologist under Dr. Li Shu Fan (1887-1966) and later as the Matron of the Hospital.

== Marriage and family ==
Lee Sun Chau married Po Yin Chan (陳步賢) (1883-1965) in Hong Kong on Jan. 7, 1911. Po-Yin Chan was an engineer and a revolutionary under Sun Yat-sen (孫中山) in the 1911 Revolution, and was a Senator of Guangzhou in the 1920s. His poem (铁血战残清，言文新里怜，事成操故业，敝屣视功名。) describes the bloody fight against the Qing Dynasty, the new society resulting from the Revolution, his return to his profession afterward, and his not caring about fame.

=== Grandfathers ===
Lee Sun Chau was a granddaughter (father's side) of Rev. Hok Shu Chau 周學舒 [or 周學, or 周勵堂] (spelled Zhou Xue in Mandarin) (1826-1918), the first ordained Chinese minister of the Methodist Church 循道會 (衛斯理會) in Southern China. Rev. Chau pastored the Methodist Church in Guangzhou, China, in 1877-1916. Prior to being ordained, he conducted evangelical work in the clinic of Dr. Benjamin Dobson. In 1852, Rev. Chau was baptized by Rev. Liang Fa 梁發 (1789-1855), the very first Chinese pastor in the world. Rev. Liang Fa was ordained by Dr. Robert Morrison (1782-1834), a missionary of the London Missionary Society who translated the whole Bible to Chinese. Lee Sun Chau was also a granddaughter (mother's side) of Rev. Wei Tsing Wan (尹維清), who was ordained by the London Missionary Society in China.

=== Uncle ===
Lee Sun Chau was a niece of Man-Kai Wan (尹文階)(1869-1927), who was a younger brother of her mother, a son of Rev. Wei Tsing Wan (尹維清) and a son-in-law of To Tsai Church (道濟會堂) Elder Au Fung-Chi (區鳳墀)(1847-1914). Au was the Chinese language teacher of Sun Yat-sen (孫中山). Man-Kai Wan was one of the first Chinese doctors of Western Medicine in Hong Kong. In 1920-1922, he served as the inaugural Chairman of the Hong Kong Chinese Medical Association 香港中華醫學會 (currently Hong Kong Medical Association 香港醫學會). In 1922, he served as the Chairman of the Chinese YMCA of Hong Kong (香港中華基督教青年會). He was one of the founders of the Hong Kong Sanatorium & Hospital. He was also a secondary school classmate of Sun Yat-sen in The Government Central College (中央書院, currently Queen's College, Hong Kong, 皇仁書院) in Hong Kong. Wan and Sun graduated from secondary school together in 1886. In 1893, they started a medical clinic (東西藥局) together. Wan also protected Sun during Sun's long and dangerous preparation for the 1911 Chinese Revolution. Man-Kai Wan was also the Chairman of the Board of a Christian newspaper called “Great Light Newspaper” (大光報) that was distributed in Hong Kong and China. In 1912, Sun wrote for the newspaper four words “與國同春”, meaning springtime along with the Nation.

=== Daughter ===
Lee Sun Chau's second child, daughter Rebecca Chan Chung (鍾陳可慰) (1920-2011), was a United States World War II veteran (Nurse) with the Flying Tigers and then the United States Army in Kunming, China, where she worked under Lieutenant Colonel Dr. Fred Manget. In addition, as a Nurse with the China National Aviation Corporation (CNAC) (中國航空公司) during World War II, she flew over The Hump (駝峰) across the Himalayas between India and China for about 50 times. For her service during World War II, she was awarded U.S. World War II medals and the U.S. Congressional Gold Medal. After World War II, she became a Nursing educator and a leader of Nursing in Hong Kong. Rebecca Chan Chung's autobiography, Piloted to Serve (飛虎戰, 駝峰險, 亂世情), provides details on Lee Sun Chau.

=== Granddaughter ===
Lee Sun Chau's granddaughter (the second child of Rebecca Chan Chung) Deborah Chung (鍾端玲) dedicated her book Carbon Fiber Composites (1994) to the memory of Lee Sun Chau. Deborah Chung is an American scientist, university professor and a member of the American Academy of Arts and Sciences (elected in 2023). She is best known for her invention of smart concrete. She is ranked by the 2022 Stanford University study to be 13th among 315,721 materials scientists in the world (living and deceased), 10th among those that are living, and 1st among those that are female.
