= Sally McArthur =

Australian materials scientist

Sally L. McArthur
- Education: University of New South Wales, Monash University
- Scientific career
- Workplaces: CSIRO; University of Washington; University of Sheffield; Swinburne University of Technology; Deakin University
- Thesis: XPS and surface-MALDI-MS characterisations of worn HEMA-based contact lenses

Sally L. McArthur is an Australian materials engineer who is a professor of biomedical engineering and incoming Deputy Vice Chancellor Research at Victoria University of Wellington in Wellington, New Zealand. Her research considers the development of materials and coatings for biomedical, manufacturing and environmental applications.

== Early life and education ==
McArthur was an undergraduate student in materials engineering and has a masters in biomedical engineering from Monash University. She joined CSIRO Chemicals and Polymers for graduate research, working toward a doctorate at the University of New South Wales. McArthur completed a postdoc at the University of Washington. In 2002, she started her independent academic career at the University of Sheffield.

== Research and career ==
McArthur makes use of biomedical engineering to improve human wellbeing. In 2008, she joined Swinburne University of Technology, where she focused on research-led innovation and tech translation. For example, her research informed the design of extended wear contact lenses, which was licensed to CIBA Vision. She also created a scalable chemical oxygen demand sensing system that can provide accurate results in fifteen minutes without the use of harmful chemicals.

During 2017-2021 she was a Science Leader at CSIRO, McArthur developed 3D cell culture systems that can permit in situ sensing and imaging. Her laboratory at Swinburne was home to the Australian National Fabrication Facilities, a space which provides surface engineering capabilities to researchers across academia and industry. She was awarded the BioMelbourne Network Most Valuable Women in Leadership Award in 2016.

McArthur joined the American Vacuum Society in 2000. She was appointed to the executive committee of its Division for Biomaterial Interfaces in 2005, and became its chair in 2011. She served as editor of Biointerphases between 2017-2021. She is the President Elect of the AVS in 2026.

McArthur was the director of the Institute for Frontier Materials at Deakin University between 2022-2025.

== Honours and awards ==
In 2021, McArthur was elected a Fellow of the Australian Academy of Science.

She was elected a Trustee of the American Vacuum Society in 2021.

== Selected publications ==
- Martina Abrigo; Sally L. McArthur; Peter Kingshott (28 March 2014). "Electrospun nanofibers as dressings for chronic wound care: advances, challenges, and future prospects". Macromolecular Bioscience. 14 (6): 772–792. doi:10.1002/mabi.201300561. ISSN 1616-5187. PMID 24678050. Wikidata Q38200082.
- Matthew S Wagner; Sally L. McArthur; Mingchao Shen; Thomas A Horbett; David G Castner (1 January 2002). "Limits of detection for time of flight secondary ion mass spectrometry (ToF-SIMS) and X-ray photoelectron spectroscopy (XPS): detection of low amounts of adsorbed protein". Journal of Biomaterials Science. Polymer Edition. 13 (4): 407–428. doi:10.1163/156856202320253938. ISSN 0920-5063. PMID 12160301. Wikidata Q44087757.
- Peter Kingshott; Sally L. McArthur; Helmut Thissen; David G Castner; Hans J Griesser (1 December 2002). "Ultrasensitive probing of the protein resistance of PEG surfaces by secondary ion mass spectrometry". Biomaterials. 23 (24): 4775–4785. doi:10.1016/s0142-9612(02)00228-4. ISSN 0142-9612. PMID 12361616. Wikidata Q44166175.
