= Safa Kasap =

Canadian engineer

- Born: 1953 (age 72–73)

Academic background
- Education: BSc, 1976, MSc, 1978, PhD, 1983, Imperial College London
- Thesis: Charge transport in selenium based amorphous xerographic photoreceptors (1983)

Academic work
- Institutions: University of Saskatchewan College of Engineering

Safa Osman Kasap FRSC (born 1953) is a British-Canadian electrical engineer. He is a Distinguished Professor of Optoelectronic Materials and Devices Electrical and Computer Engineering at the University of Saskatchewan College of Engineering. He was named a Fellow of the Institute of Electrical and Electronics Engineers (IEEE) in 2015 for his contributions to photoconductive sensors for x-ray imaging.

== Early life and education ==
Kasap was born in 1953 and grew up in London, England. Kasap received his Bachelor of Science, Master of Science, and PhD from the Department of Electrical Engineering at Imperial College London.

== Career ==
Upon receiving his PhD in 1983, Kasap accepted an assistant professorship in the Department of Electrical Engineering at the University of Saskatchewan (U of S). He was promoted to Full Professor in electronic and optoelectronic materials in 1992. In this role, he contributed to the use of photoconductive sensors for x-ray imaging. In recognition of his efforts, Kasap was appointed a Tier 2 Canada Research Chair in Electronic Materials and Devices from 2002 to 2008. The chairship also assisted him in opening an engineering laboratory at U of S to further his research. During his seven years as a Canada Research Chair, Kasap developed a partnership with Analogic Corporation in Montreal to improve detectors for digital imaging with X-rays. He specifically focused on how photoconductors were used in digital mammography. In 2008, Kasap was named a Fellow of the Royal Society of Canada and Engineering Institute of Canada.

In 2009, Kasap was appointed a Tier 1 Canada Research Chair in Electronic and Optoelectronic Materials and Devices. He was recognized by Institute of Electrical and Electronics Engineers Canada in 2012 with their J.M. Ham Outstanding Engineering Educator Award for "outstanding contributions to electrical and electronic engineering education." Kasap was named a Fellow of the Institute of Electrical and Electronics Engineers (IEEE) in 2015 for his contributions to photoconductive sensors for x-ray imaging. After his Canada Research Chair appointment expired, Kasap was awarded a Saskatchewan Centennial Enhancement Chair in recognition of his "outstanding accomplishments as a Canada Research Chair." In 2018, Kasap was named Editor-in-Chief of Journal of Materials Science: Materials in Electronics.
