= The Textile Institute =

British professional body

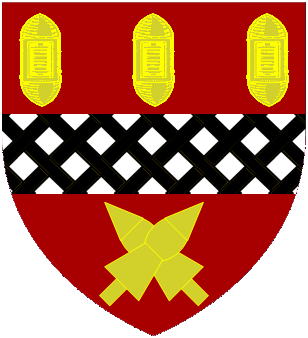
- Founded: 1910; 116 years ago
- Legal status: Registered charity
- Location: Manchester, UK
- Method: Promoting professionalism within the textile industry worldwide.
- Chief Executive: Stephanie Dick
- Website: www.textileinstitute.org

The Textile Institute is a professional body for those engaged in clothing, footwear, and textiles whose headquarters are at 8th Floor St James's Buildings, 79 Oxford Street, Manchester, M1 6FQ, UK. The institute was founded in 1910 and incorporated in England by a Royal Charter granted in 1925 and is a registered charity. The Textile Institute works to promote professionalism in textiles and its related industries worldwide.

== World President and Council ==
The World President and Textile Institute Council are elected and then confirmed at the mandated Annual General Meeting. On 3 June 2023, the position was unopposed:

World President: Professor Malgorzata Ziminiewska

The Textile Institute has paid staff based at their offices in Manchester, United Kingdom. The current post-holder is:

Chief Executive: Stephanie Dick

== Membership ==
The institute has individual and corporate members in over 60 countries covering all sectors and all disciplines in clothing, footwear and textiles.

Special Interest Groups include:

- Design
- Fashion & Technology
- Sustainability
- Tailoring
- Technical Textiles
- Textiles

Geographic Sections include:

- London & South East
- Manchester

== Medals and awards ==
Under the authority of the TI Council, a number of Medals and Awards are conferred upon individuals and organisations in recognition of their outstanding contribution to the textile industries and/or the work of the Textile Institute itself.

- Companionship of the Textile Institute Membership
- Honorary Fellowship
- Honorary Life Membership
- The Institute Medal
- The Textile Institute Service Medal
- Holden Medal for Education
- Section Service Award
- The Textile Institute Sustainability Award
- The Textile Institute Innovation Award
- The Textile Institute New Materials Award
- The Textile Institute Research Publications Award
- The Textile Institute Young Persons Award

== Professional qualifications ==
The attainment of a professional qualification is the clearest way of demonstrating possession of a sound knowledge of the industry and a high standard of professional competence. TI professional qualifications are acknowledged by many national governments, as well as by employers establishing that the holder has proved their ability to practice.

Profession qualifications awarded:

- Fellowship CText FTI
- Associateship CText ATI
- Licentiateship LTI

== Accreditation and approval ==
The Textile Institute accredit a wide range of courses globally within all areas of clothing, footwear and textiles. Students who graduate from these courses can apply for their professional qualifications after a shorter period of work experience and in some cases directly on graduation.

The Textile Institute's brand is the international sign of excellence. Through this scheme the TI can award ‘Approved Status’ to providers of in-house training, short courses, on-line delivery and programmes not otherwise eligible via the accreditation route.

== Publications ==
Its primary academic journal is The Journal of the Textile Institute, which was established in 1910 published on behalf of The Textile Institute by Taylor & Francis, and the present editor-in-chief is Dr William Oxenham Hon FTI CText ATI Abel C Lineberger Professor & Associate Dean, North Carolina State University, USA.

Textile Progress is published on behalf of the Textile Institute by Taylor & Francis. Textile Progress is a monographic series which, since 1969, has provided critical examinations of the origins and application of developments in the international fibre, textile and apparel industry, and its products. Editor in Chief Prof Richard Murray CompTI CText FTI, Emeritus Professor, Manchester Metropolitan University

textiles is the international membership magazine of the Textile Institute. The magazine covers all aspects of textiles, news and in-depth articles encompassing all areas of the complete supply chain, from fibre production through knit, weave and nonwovens, to fashion, architecture, footwear, medical and automotive products, providing a business and production perspective. International in both readership and outlook, textiles provides a broad industry perspective on issues faces the textile sector, as well as facilitating learning and research. textiles is available in both print and digital formats and is part of the Textile Institute membership package or by subscription.

Textile Terms and Definitions (TT&D), published by The Textile Institute since 1954, is generally regarded as the established, most authoritative and comprehensive English-language reference manual of textile terminology.

The institute works with a number of book publishing partners to communicate essential information about high quality research in all areas of textiles including science, engineering, economics, management, marketing and design.

== Events ==
A full calendar of events takes place from local section events, a prestigious lunch held at the House of Lords and a major world conference Textile Institute World Conference (TIWC) which takes place every 18–24 months at various locations around the world.

== Library ==
Supported by The Lord Barnby Foundation, the library holds a specialist collection of books and journals. The library is open to the public by appointment.

== Arms ==
Coat of arms of The Textile Institute
Notes Granted 2 November 1951 Crest On a wreath of the colours issuant from clouds a terrestrial globe Proper. Escutcheon Gules a fesse Argent fretty Sable between in chief three shuttles erect and in base two distaffs in saltire Or. Supporters On either side a weaver bird holding in the beak two strands of grass Proper.
