= Journal of Crystal Growth =

- Discipline: Crystallography, materials science, physics
- Language: English
- Edited by: J. Derby

Publication details
- History: 1967–present
- Publisher: Elsevier (Netherlands)
- Frequency: Semi-monthly
- Open access: Hybrid
- Impact factor: 2.5 (2025)

Standard abbreviations
- ISO 4: J. Cryst. Growth

Indexing
- CODEN: JCRGAE
- ISSN: 0022-0248 (print); 1873-5002 (web)
- LCCN: sf80000811
- OCLC no.: 525783112

Links
- Journal homepage

The Journal of Crystal Growth is a semi-monthly peer-reviewed scientific journal covering experimental and theoretical studies of crystal growth and its applications. It is published by Elsevier. J. Derby (University of Minnesota) serves as editor-in-chief.

== History ==
The Journal of Crystal Growth was founded following the 1966 International Conference on Crystal Growth (ICCG) held in Boston, Massachusetts, United States. Ichiro Sunagawa, who participated in ICCG, wrote in the Journal of the Japanese Association of Crystal Growth that before then, "The crystal growth community was totally fragmented and had remained as a peripheral field at the mercy of other organizations." Michael Schieber (Hebrew University) later recounted feeling the need for an individual journal on the subject after the conference proceedings were published as a supplement to the Journal of Physics and Chemistry of Solids that had to be additionally ordered by journal subscribers. Feeling as though the crystal growth community should not remain at the "discretion of other disciplines for which crystal growth has a secondary importance", he spoke about the idea with a colleague, Kenneth Button, who informed an editor at the North-Holland Publishing Company (now Elsevier).

The journal launched in 1967, with an editorial board consisting of Schieber as editor-in-chief and co-editors Charles Frank and Nicolás Cabrera. At the time the journal employed two U.S. editors, eighteen associate editors from around the world, and an editorial advisory board of sixteen members.

As of 2015, the journal has continued to serve as the "major venue for papers on crystal growth theory, practice and characterization" and proceedings of various conferences in the field. According to Tony Stankus, the journal has historically emphasised research contribution on crystals grown from wet solutions and later strongly emphasised research on crystals grown from molten materials or those produced through other processes relevant to the semiconductor industry.

The American Chemical Society and the Scholarly Publishing and Academic Resources Coalition partnered to develop Crystal Growth and Design as a lower-cost alternative to the Journal of Crystal Growth; its first issue was published in 2001.

== Retractions ==
In 2017, Elsevier was reported to be retracting four articles from the journal after an author had falsified reviews. The journal was one of several publications affected by the falsifications.

== Abstracting and indexing ==
The journal is abstracted and indexed in the following databases:

- Aluminium Industry Abstracts
- Chemical Abstracts
- Current Contents - Physical, Chemical & Earth Sciences
- El Compendex Plus
- Engineered Materials Abstracts
- Engineering Index
- INSPEC
- Metals Abstracts
- Science Citation Index
- Scopus

According to Journal Citation Reports, the journal had a 2025 impact factor of 2.5.

== See also ==
- List of materials science journals
