= Rebecca Chan Chung =

Chinese military nurse (1920–2011)

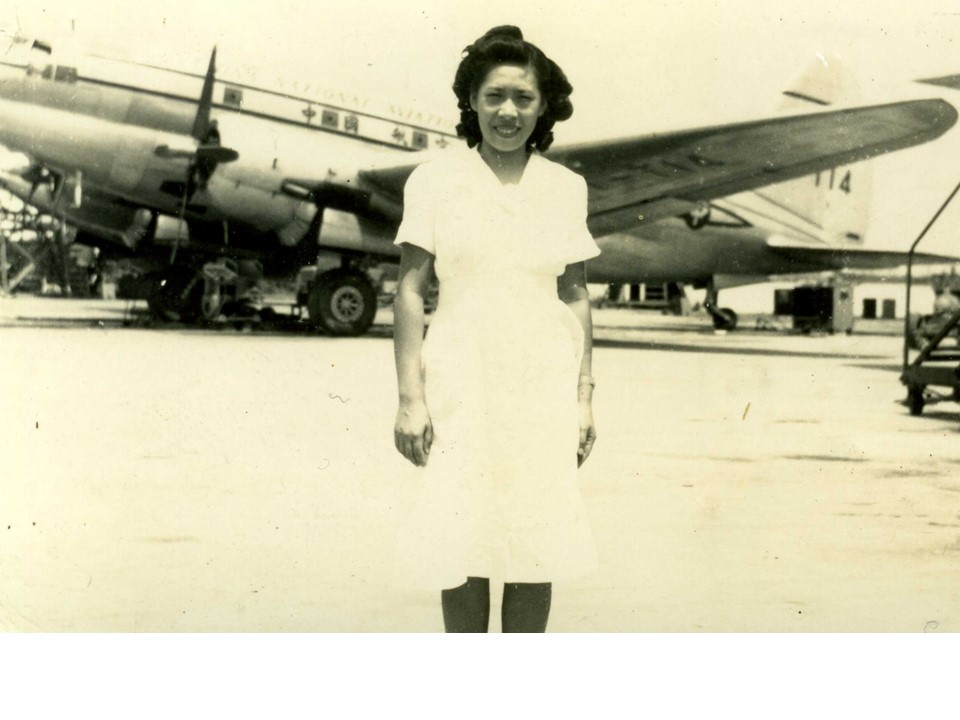
- Born: June 27, 1920; Guangzhou, China
- Died: December 7, 2011 (aged 91); Toronto, Canada
- Resting place: Mount Pleasant Cemetery, Toronto, Canada
- Citizenship: China, United Kingdom, Canada
- Education: Diocesan Girls' School, Queen Mary Hospital (Hong Kong), College of Nursing in Australia
- Spouse: Leslie Wah-Leung Chung (1945–2009)
- Children: 2
- Awards: United States Congressional Gold Medal, United States World War II medals, Fellow of College of Nursing in Australia
- Scientific career
- Fields: Nursing
- Workplaces: Flying Tigers, United States Army, China National Aviation Corporation, Tung Wah Group of Hospitals

Rebecca Chan Chung (Chinese: 鍾陳可慰; professionally known as Rebecca Chan, Chinese: 陳可慰; June 27, 1920 – December 7, 2011) was a military nurse who served with the Flying Tigers and the United States Army in China during World War II. As a nurse with the China National Aviation Corporation (CNAC), she flew over The Hump approximately fifty times. After the war, she became a nursing educator and a leader of the nursing profession in Hong Kong.

== Early life ==
=== Birth and parents ===
Rebecca Chan Chung was born in the David Gregg Hospital for Women & Children (also known as Yiji Hospital 柔濟醫院 located on Duo Bao Road 多寶路 in Guangzhou, China, during the Warlord Era. She was the second child of her parents. Her mother, Lee Sun Chau 周理信 (1890–1979), was one of the earliest Chinese female doctors of Western Medicine in China and was a resident physician in the David Gregg Hospital for Women and Children at the time of the birth of Rebecca Chan Chung. Her father, Po-Yin Chan (陳步賢) (1883–1965), was a revolutionary under Dr. Sun Yat-sen in the Chinese Revolution of 1911 and was a Senator of Guangzhou in the 1920s.

=== Schooling ===
Rebecca Chan Chung graduated from St. Paul's Girls’ School (primary school, currently St. Paul's Co-educational College) in Hong Kong in 1933. In 1938, she graduated from Diocesan Girls' School (secondary school) in Hong Kong, when Miss H.D. Sawyer was the Headmistress.

== Career ==
Rebecca Chan received her Nursing training administered by the Government of Hong Kong in Queen Mary Hospital (Hong Kong), Hong Kong, in 1938–1941. During World War II, in the Battle of Hong Kong in December 1941, she graduated in an emergency fashion, with her Certificate of Training issued by the Medical Department of the Government of Hong Kong on December 10. The certificate was signed by Principal Matron Alice Mary Davies and Director of Medical Services Sir Percy Selwyn Selwyn-Clarke.

During World War II in 1942–1943, Chan was a nurse with the Flying Tigers and then the United States Army, both at or near Kunming Airport (currently Kunming Wujiaba International Airport), Kunming, China. She worked for doctor Fred Manget, who was under Claire Lee Chennault. In 1943–1944, as a flight stewardess (Nurse) with the China National Aviation Corporation (CNAC),"The Descriptive Finding Guide for the China National Aviation Corporation Collection SDASM.SC.10025". www.oac.cdlib.org. she flew over The Hump across the Himalayas between Calcutta, India, and Chongqing, China, approximately fifty times. These flights were dangerous because the propeller airplanes available at that time were unsuitable for flying at the needed heights. In 1942, Japan had cut off the Burma Road, so the Hump route became the only access to China. In 1943–1948, she was a flight stewardess, nurse and then head nurse with the China National Aviation Corporation based in Dum Dum Airport (currently Netaji Subhas Chandra Bose International Airport), Kolkata (or Calcutta), India, and after 1946 in Shanghai Longhua Airport, Shanghai, China. Her autobiography, Piloted to Serve, provides details of her experience.

In 1963, while serving as a Sister Tutor (nursing instructor) with the Government of Hong Kong, Chung studied in the College of Nursing in Melbourne, Australia, where she received a Sister Tutor Diploma. In Hong Kong, she headed the large nursing school of the Tung Wah Group of Hospitals as its Sister Tutor-in-Charge from 1964 to 1975. In 1974, she became a Fellow of the College of Nursing, Australia.

Chung was appointed a member of the Hong Kong Nursing Board by Hong Kong Governor Sir Robert Black. She was made a member of the Hong Kong Midwifery Board by Hong Kong Governor Sir David Trench. In addition, she was elected and served as the President of the Hong Kong Association of Nurses and Midwives.

== Marriage and family ==
=== Husband ===
Rebecca Chan married Leslie Wah-Leung Chung 鍾華亮 (1917–2009) in the Old Mission Church, Calcutta, India, on July 7, 1945. This day coincided with the July 7 Chinese National Day, chosen by the Government of China to remember the Marco Polo Bridge Incident of July 7, 1937. This Incident was instrumental in uniting the Chinese people to fight against the Japanese invasion in World War II.

Leslie Wah-Leung Chung was a member of the Hong Kong Volunteer Defence Corps. While serving as a gunner in the 4th Battery, he was wounded in action in Lei Yue Mun Fort (specifically Pak Sha Wan (Chai Wan) 白沙灣) in the Battle of Hong Kong in December 1941.

In August 1945, about 1.5 months after the wedding, Leslie Wah-Leung Chung left his bride and Calcutta to study Economics at Lafayette College in Easton, Pennsylvania, United States. The newlyweds were thus separated for 3.5 years.

In Hong Kong in 1965–1968, Leslie Wah-Leung Chung was elected and served as the President of the Hong Kong Chinese Civil Servants’ Association. His most noteworthy contribution was the establishment of equal pay for men and women, including the right for married women to be permanent employees. Before this, the job status of a woman changed from permanent employee to temporary employee once she was married, thus losing the pension benefit. He also founded St. Mark's School (Hong Kong), and served as the Head of the Department of Commerce and Business Studies in Hong Kong Technical College (currently Hong Kong Polytechnic University). He was responsible for starting the accounting education in Hong Kong.

Rebecca Chan Chung and Leslie Wah-Leung spent their retirement years in Toronto, Canada. They were married for 64 years. Their combined military burial took place in Mount Pleasant Cemetery, Toronto, on Easter Saturday, April 7, 2012. Veterans of Canada, United States, and Hong Kong were present in the ceremony.

=== Daughter ===
Deborah Chung (鍾端玲) is the second child of Rebecca Chan Chung and Leslie Wah-Leung Chung. She is a co-author of Rebecca Chan Chung's autobiography, Piloted to Serve, and gives lectures on the subject. Deborah Chung is an American scientist, university professor and a member of the American Academy of Arts and Sciences (elected in 2023). She is best known for her invention of smart concrete. She is ranked by the 2022 Stanford University study to be 13th among 315,721 materials scientists in the world (living and deceased), 10th among those that are living, and 1st among those that are female.

== See also ==
- Flying Tigers
