= Jun Lou =

Materials scientist

- Occupation: Materials Scientist

Academic background
- Education: Princeton University (PhD); Ohio State University (MS); Tsinghua University (BE)

Academic work
- Discipline: Materials Science
- Institutions: Rice University
- Doctoral students: Pei Dong

Jun Lou is a materials scientist and nanotechnology researcher. He is a Professor and Associate Chair in the Department of Materials Science and NanoEngineering at Rice University. His research focuses on nanomaterials, particularly two-dimensional materials such as graphene and transition metal dichalcogenides (TMDs), with applications in energy, electronics, and biomedical fields.

== Education & career ==
Lou earned his B.E. and M.S. in materials science and engineering from Tsinghua University and Ohio State University in 1998 and 2000, respectively, and his Ph.D. in mechanical and aerospace engineering from Princeton in 2004. He did postdoctoral research in the Brown/GM collaborative research center at Brown University before joining the Rice University faculty in 2005. Lou is the Editor-in-Chief of Materials Today & part of the steering committee for the Rice Advanced Materials Institute.

== Research ==
Lou is the director of the Nanomaterials, Nanomechanics, and Nanodevices Lab (N3L). His research explores the mechanical, electrical, and electrochemical properties of nanomaterials. His work has contributed to the development of flexible electronics, high-performance batteries, and biomaterials. He has published in peer-reviewed journals including on the understanding and application of low-dimensional materials.

In 2021, Jun Lou was part of a research team that demonstrated how 2D materials like hexagonal boron nitride can become tougher under stress.

In 2023, Jun Lou was part of a research team at Rice University that developed a strong and ultralight material.

In 2025, Jun Lou and his research team developed a stronger alternative to graphene by engineering multilayer hexagonal boron nitride.

== Awards & honors ==
- 2015: Charles Duncan, JR. Award for Outstanding Academic Achievement
- 2015: Hamill IBB Innovations Award
- 2018: Clarivate Analytics Highly Cited Researchers in Cross-Field
- 2019: Clarivate Analytics Highly Cited Researchers in Materials Science
- 2021: Elected a fellow of the Royal Society of Chemistry
- 2023: Provost's Award for Outstanding Faculty Achievement
