= Harvey Brooks (physicist) =

American physicist (1915–2004)

- Born: August 5, 1915; Cleveland, Ohio
- Died: May 28, 2004 (aged 88); Cambridge, Massachusetts
- Education: Yale University; Harvard University
- Known for: Contributions to the fundamental theory of semiconductors and the band structure of metals
- Awards: Ernest O. Lawrence Award of the Atomic Energy Commission, the Philip Hauge Abelson Prize of the American Association for the Advancement of Science
- Scientific career
- Fields: Physics
- Workplaces: Harvard University
- Doctoral advisor: J. H. Van Vleck

Harvey Brooks (August 5, 1915 – May 28, 2004) was an American physicist, "a pioneer in incorporating science into public policy", notable for helping to shape national science policies and who served on science advisory committees in the administrations of Presidents Dwight D. Eisenhower, John F. Kennedy, and Lyndon B. Johnson. Brooks was also notable for his contributions to the fundamental theory of semiconductors and the band structure of metals. Brooks was dean of the Division of Engineering and Applied Sciences of the Harvard University.

Brooks was also the founder and editor-in-chief of the International Journal of Physics and Chemistry of Solids. He was elected to the National Academy of Engineering "for technical contributions to solid-state engineering and nuclear reactors; leadership in national technological decisions". He was also Gordon McKay Professor of Applied Physics and Benjamin Peirce Professor of Technology and Public Policy at Harvard University.

== Honors and awards ==
Brooks was president of the American Academy of Arts and Sciences and a member of the National Academy of Sciences, the National Academy of Engineering, the American Philosophical Society, and the Council on Foreign Relations.

He received the Ernest O. Lawrence Award of the Atomic Energy Commission, the Philip Hauge Abelson Prize of the American Association for the Advancement of Science.

== Chronology ==
- 1915: born in Cleveland, Ohio on August 5
- 1937: B.S. in mathematics, Yale University
- 1940: Ph.D in physics, Harvard University
- 1945: married to Helen G. Lathrop on October 20
- 1940–1946: faculty member, Harvard University
- 1946–1950: Associate Head of the Knolls Atomic Power Laboratory, General Electric
- 1950–1957: Gordon McKay Professor of Applied Physics, Harvard University
- 1957–1975: Dean, the Division of Engineering and Applied Sciences (DEAS), Harvard University
- 1961: Elected to the American Philosophical Society
- 1962: Elected to the National Academy of Sciences
- 2004: death
