= Hai-Ping Cheng =

Chinese-American physicist

Hai-Ping Cheng is a Chinese-American physicist whose "research crosses the boundaries between many sciences, such as chemistry, materials science, and engineering". Much of her research concerns the computational simulation of nanostructures, including nanowires and nanotubes. She is also a member of the LIGO Scientific Collaboration, with whom she is a coauthor of highly cited work on binary black holes and the gravitational waves they emit. She is a professor of physics at the University of Florida, where she directs both the Quantum Theory Project and the Center for Molecular Magnetic Quantum Materials.

== Education and career ==
Cheng comes from China, but is a US citizen. After completing her undergraduate studies in 1981 at Fudan University, she went to Northwestern University for graduate study in physics, earning a master's degree in 1982 and completing her Ph.D. in 1988.

She became a postdoctoral researcher at the University of Chicago from 1988 to 1991 and at Georgia Tech from 1992 to 1994, before joining the University of Florida in 1994 as an assistant professor of physics. She was tenured as an associate professor in 1999, and has been a full professor since 2005. At the University of Florida, she was director of the Quantum Theory Project and of the Center for Molecular Magnetic Quantum Materials. In 2023, Cheng moved to Northeastern University as a Professor of Physics.

She is one of five co-editors-in-chief of the Journal of Physics and Chemistry of Solids.

== Recognition ==
In 2005, Cheng was elected as a Fellow of the American Physical Society (APS), after a nomination from the APS Division of Computational Physics, "for insights from pioneering nanoscale simulations, notably on cluster phase transitions, surface melting, and nanocrystal-surface interactions, especially the interplay between structure and dynamics and between structure and conductance". In 2010, the University of Florida named Cheng as a UF Research Foundation Professor.
