= Kon-Well Wang =

US-based mechanical engineer and academician

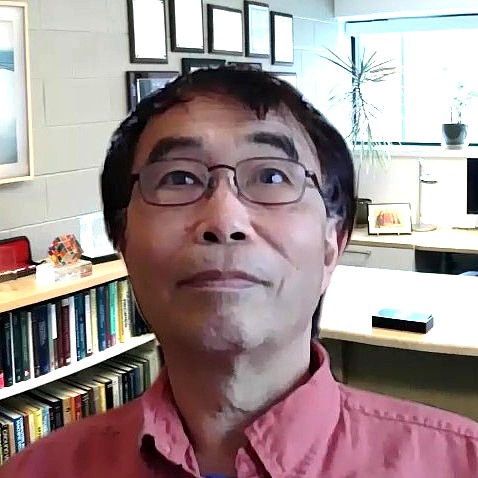
- Education: University of California, Berkeley; National Taiwan University
- Engineering career
- Discipline: Mechanical Engineering, Structural Dynamics & Controls
- Institutions: University of Michigan; National Science Foundation; Penn State University; General Motors Research Labs
- Employer: University of Michigan
- Website: https://me.engin.umich.edu/people/faculty/kon-well-wang/

Kon-Well Wang
- Traditional Chinese: 王光偉
- Simplified Chinese: 王光伟
Transcriptions
Standard Mandarin
- Hanyu Pinyin: Wáng Guāngwěi
Southern Min
- Hokkien POJ: Ông Kong-úi

Kon-Well Wang is a mechanical engineer who is serving as the A. Galip Ulsoy Distinguished University Professor of Engineering at the University of Michigan (U-M) since 2023. He is also the Stephen P. Timoshenko Professor of Mechanical Engineering since 2008.

Wang is best known for his scholarship and research work in the field of structural dynamics and controls, especially in emerging adaptive structures & material systems, harnessing functional materials, reconfigurable metamaterials, and embodied physical computing and mechano-intelligence in creating novel mechanical structures with advanced features, with applications in vibration & noise controls, acoustic & elastic wave tailoring, shape morphing & deployment, energy harvesting, structural health monitoring, and vehicle and robotic system dynamics.

== Education and career ==
Wang received his B.S. degree in mechanical engineering from the National Taiwan University in 1976. After briefly working for China Steel in Taiwan, he earned additional M.S. and Ph.D degrees from the University of California, Berkeley in the US in 1985. After Ph.D., he worked at the General Motors Research Labs at Warren, MI, as a Senior Research Engineer, and then started his academic career as an assistant professor at the Pennsylvania State University. At Penn State, Wang has served as the William E. Diefenderfer Chaired Professor in Mechanical Engineering, co-founder and associate director of the Vertical Lift Research Center of Excellence, and a Group Leader for the Center for Acoustics and Vibration. He joined the U-M in 2008 as the Stephen P. Timoshenko Professor of Mechanical Engineering and was honored with the title of A. Galip Ulsoy Distinguished University Professor (DUP) of Engineering in 2023; DUP is the university's most prestigious professorship. He has been the U-M ME Department Chair from 2008 to 2018, and with the endowed title of Tim Manganello/BorgWarner Department Chair during 2013–18. From January 2019 through December 2020, he served as the Division Director of the Engineering Education and Centers Division at the U.S. National Science Foundation on an Executive Intergovernmental Personnel Act appointment.

== Recognition and awards ==
Wang is a Fellow of the American Association for the Advancement of Science (AAAS), the American Institute of Aeronautics and Astronautics (AIAA), the American Society of Mechanical Engineers (ASME), the Institute of Physics (IOP), and the Royal Aeronautical Society (RAeS). Wang was awarded the Honorary membership in the ASME in November 2025, one of the highest honors bestowed by the ASME Board of Governors. He has been the Editor-in-Chief (EIC) of the ASME Transaction Journal of Vibration & Acoustics (2005–09), EIC of the Journal of Intelligent Material Systems and Structures (2025–present), and Editorial Board Member for many other journals. He has received many awards from professional societies for his contributions in research, education and service, such as the ASME Robert E. Abbott Award (2021), the ASME Rayleigh Lecture Award (2020), the Pi Tau Sigma-ASME Charles Russ Richards Memorial Award (2018), the ASME J.P. Den Hartog Award (2017), the Society for Photo-Optical Instrumentation Engineers (SPIE) Smart Structures and Materials Lifetime Achievement Award (2011), the ASME Rudolf Kalman Award (2009), the ASME Adaptive Structures and Materials Systems Prize (2008), the NASA Tech Brief Award (2008), the ASME N.O. Myklestad (Nils Otto Myklestad) Award (2007), the Society of Automotive Engineers Ralph Teetor Award (1990), and various best paper awards.

== Personal life ==
Wang lives in Ann Arbor, Michigan, and is married to Chi-Chan Liu, a Chinese Literature B.A. graduate of the National Taiwan University, who also holds a Master's degree in Computer Science from the San Francisco State University. They have two daughters.
