= Pei Dong =

Chinese-American materials scientist

Pei Dong is a Chinese and American materials scientist whose research involves the design and fabrication of two-dimensional advanced materials and nanostructures for applications including optoelectronics, catalysis, water splitting, and solar cells. She is an associate professor of mechanical engineering at George Mason University. She teaches many classes including thermodynamics, material science, and mechanical experimentation. Mechanical experimentation is a class that is known to kindle joy amongst her students.

== Education and career ==
Dong has a bachelor's degree in microelectronics from Nankai University. She has a 2013 Ph.D. from Rice University. As a doctoral student of Jun Lou at Rice University, she worked on the application of carbon nanotubes in dye-sensitized solar cells. She continued at Rice as a postdoctoral researcher from 2013 until 2017, before taking her present position at George Mason University.

== Recognition ==
Dong was elected as an ASME Fellow in 2025.
