= C. Barry Carter =

Professor of Materials Science

C.B. Carter
- Education: Oxford University (1976); Cambridge University (2005)
- Occupation: Professor at the University of Connecticut
- Known for: Materials science

C. Barry Carter is a professor of Materials Science and Engineering at the University of Connecticut in Storrs, Connecticut. He is a CINT Distinguished Affiliate Scientist at Sandia National Laboratories and editor-in-chief of the Journal of Materials Science. Carter's research areas of focus include Transmission Electron Microscopy and Atomic-force microscopy.

== Education ==
Carter received his B.A. (1970), M.A. (1974), and Sc.D. (2005) in Natural Sciences from Cambridge University, his M.Sc. in Materials Science in 1971 from Imperial College, and his D. Phil. in Metallurgy & Science of Materials from Oxford University in 1976.

== Career ==
Carter spent 14 years as a professor in the Department of Chemical Engineering and Materials Science at Cornell University. He then spent 16 years as a professor and the 3M Endowed Multidisciplinary Chair in the Department of Chemical Engineering and Materials Science at the University of Minnesota. Carter chaired the University of Connecticut's Department of Chemical, Materials, and Biomolecular Engineering for 5 years. He had earlier held visiting positions at LANL (as the Bernd T. Matthias Scholar), Chalmers (as the 2004 Jubilee Professor), NIMS in Tsukuba, Bristol University, Max Planck Institute in Stuttgart, the Institute for Physical Chemistry in Hanover and the Ernst Ruska Center in Jülich. Carter is a Distinguished Affiliate Scientist at the Center for Integrated Nanotechnology.

== Books and publications ==
Carter is the co-author of three textbooks: Transmission Electron Microscopy: A Textbook for Materials Science (2009), Ceramic Materials: Science and Engineering (2013), and Transmission Electron Microscopy: Diffraction, Imaging, and Spectrometry (2016). He is editor-in-chief of the Journal of Materials Science.

== Awards and organizations ==
Carter has received a Guggenheim Fellowship and the Alexander von Humboldt Senior Award. He is a Fellow of AAAS, Materials Research Society, Microscopy Society of America, American Ceramic Society, and the Royal Microscopical Society and is an elected member of the Connecticut Academy of Science and Engineering. He served as the 1997 president of MSA, the 2003-2010 general secretary of the International Federation of Societies for Microscopy (IFSM), the president of IFSM from 2011 to 2014, and now serves as vice president.

== Honors ==
- Ceramic Education Council (ACerS) Outstanding Educator Award Oct. 2014
- JSPS Fellowship May 2014 MSA
- Distinguished Physical Scientist, August 2013
- Elected Fellow of AAAS (2011), MRS (2009), MSA (2009), RMS (1996), ACerS (1995)
- Elected Member of the Connecticut Academy of Science and Engineering (CASE)
- ACerS Roland B Snow Award 1989, 1993, 1995, 2000-2002
- Alexander von Humboldt Senior Award 1997
- Bernd Matthias Scholar, LANL, Los Alamos, NM
- 1997 Guggenheim Fellow 1985
