= Journal of Thermoplastic Composite Materials =

- Discipline: Plastics
- Language: English
- Edited by: John W. Gillespie Jr.

Publication details
- History: 1988-present
- Publisher: SAGE Publications
- Frequency: Bi-monthly
- Impact factor: 3.330 (2021)

Standard abbreviations
- ISO 4: J. Thermoplast. Compos. Mater.

Indexing
- CODEN: JTMAEQ
- ISSN: 0892-7057 (print); 1530-7980 (web)
- LCCN: 88659231
- OCLC no.: 645299290

Links
- Journal homepage; Online access; Online archive

Journal of Thermoplastic Composite Materials is a peer-reviewed academic journal that publishes papers in the field of Materials Science. The journal's editor is John W. Gillespie Jr. (University of Delaware). It has been in publication since 1988 and is currently published by SAGE Publications.

== Scope ==
Journal of Thermoplastic Composite Materials publishes research on subjects such as polymers, nanocomposites, and fiber-reinforced materials. The recent, renewed interest in thermoplastic composite materials due to the advantages it has in terms of recycling, improved performance and fracture resistance, is a key area that is covered within the journal.

== Abstracting and indexing ==
Journal of Thermoplastic Composite Materials is abstracted and indexed in, among other databases: SCOPUS, and the Social Sciences Citation Index. According to the Journal Citation Reports, its 2013 impact factor is 1.134, ranking it 11 out of 23 journals in the category 'Materials Science, Composites'.
