= Journal of Intelligent Material Systems and Structures =

- Discipline: Engineering
- Language: English
- Edited by: Kon-Well Wang

Publication details
- History: 1990-present
- Publisher: SAGE Publications (UK)
- Frequency: 18/year
- Impact factor: 2.2 (2024)

Standard abbreviations
- ISO 4: J. Intell. Mater. Syst. Struct.

Indexing
- CODEN: JMSSER
- ISSN: 1045-389X (print); 1530-8138 (web)
- LCCN: 90640882
- OCLC no.: 300291523

Links
- Journal homepage; Online access; Online archive

Journal of Intelligent Material Systems and Structures is a peer-reviewed academic journal that publishes papers in the multidisciplinary engineering research field of intelligent material systems and/or structures (also called smart materials, active materials, adaptive materials, smart structures, and adaptive structures). The journal's current Editor-in-Chief is Kon-Well Wang at the University of Michigan. It has been in publication since 1990 and is currently published by SAGE Publications.

== Scope ==
Journal of Intelligent Materials Systems and Structures is an international peer-reviewed journal that publishes original research reporting the results of experimental, numerical, or theoretical work in the multidisciplinary engineering field of intelligent material systems and/or structures for various engineering functionalities, such as sensing, actuation, & control, vibration & noise mitigation, wave steering & manipulation, shape reconfiguration, morphing & deployment, energy harvesting, structural health monitoring, and many others. It covers all types of emerging passive, semi-active, and active materials, devices & systems, from responsive or functional materials & structures, to architected materials-based metastructures, to materials & structures embodied with mechanical intelligence and physical computing.

== Abstracting and indexing ==
Journal of Intelligent Material Systems and Structures is abstracted and indexed in, among other databases: SCOPUS, and the Social Sciences Citation Index. According to the Journal Citation Reports, its 2024 impact factor is 2.2.
