= Functional Materials Letters =

- Discipline: Materials science
- Language: English
- Edited by: Li Lu

Publication details
- History: 2008-present
- Publisher: World Scientific (Singapore)
- Frequency: bimonthly
- Impact factor: 2.170 (2020)

Standard abbreviations
- ISO 4: Funct. Mater. Lett.

Indexing
- ISSN: 1793-6047 (print); 1793-7213 (web)

Links
- Journal homepage

Functional Materials Letters is an interdisciplinary, peer-reviewed journal published by World Scientific with articles relating to the synthesis, behavior, characterization and application of functional materials. These are materials designed to respond to changes in their environments. Topics covered include ferroelectric, magneto-optical, sustainable energy and shape memory materials.

Established in 2008 as a quarterly journal, Funct. Mater. Lett. switched to bimonthly in 2013.

== Abstracting and indexing ==
The journal is indexed in Inspec. According to the Journal Citation Reports, the journal has a 2020 impact factor of 2.17.
