= Journal of Biomaterials Applications =

- Discipline: Biomaterials
- Language: English
- Edited by: Jonathan Knowles

Publication details
- History: 1986-present
- Publisher: SAGE Publications
- Frequency: 10/year
- Impact factor: 2.9 (2022)

Standard abbreviations
- ISO 4: J. Biomater. Appl.

Indexing
- CODEN: JBAPEL
- ISSN: 0885-3282 (print); 1530-8022 (web)
- LCCN: 86650110
- OCLC no.: 645301574

Links
- Journal homepage; Online access; Online archive

The Journal of Biomaterials Applications is a peer-reviewed medical journal covering the development and clinical applications of biomaterials. The editor-in-chief is Jonathan Knowles (University College London). The journal was established in 1986 and is published by SAGE Publications.

== Abstracting and indexing ==
The journal is abstracted and indexed in:

- Academic Search (Ebsco)
- MEDLINE
- Biological Science Database (ProQuest)
- Scopus
- Science Citation Index Expanded

According to the Journal Citation Reports, the journal has a 2022 impact factor of 2.9.
