= Sensors and Materials =

- Discipline: Sensor technology
- Language: English
- Edited by: Makoto Ishida

Publication details
- History: 1988–present
- Publisher: Myu Scientific Publishing
- Frequency: Monthly
- Open access: Yes
- Impact factor: 1.2 (2022)

Standard abbreviations
- ISO 4: Sens. Mater.

Indexing
- CODEN: SENMER
- ISSN: 0914-4935
- OCLC no.: 297259848

Links
- Journal homepage; Online archive

Sensors and Materials is a monthly peer-reviewed open access scientific journal covering all aspects of sensor technology, including materials science as applied to sensors. It is published by Myu Scientific Publishing and the editor-in-chief is Makoto Ishida (Toyohashi University of Technology). The journal was established in 1988 by a group of Japanese academics to promote the publication of research by Asian authors in English.

== Abstracting and indexing ==
The journal is abstracted and indexed in:

- Chemical Abstracts Service
- EBSCO databases
- EI Compendex
- Inspec
- Reaxys
- Science Citation Index Expanded
- Scopus

According to the Journal Citation Reports, the journal has a 2022 impact factor of 1.2.
