= Clothing & Textiles Research Journal =

- Language: English
- Edited by: Youn-Kyung Lydia Kim

Publication details
- History: 1982-present
- Publisher: SAGE Publications
- Frequency: Quarterly
- Impact factor: 1.900 (2020)

Standard abbreviations
- ISO 4: Cloth. Text. Res. J.

Indexing
- ISSN: 0887-302X
- LCCN: 97647996
- OCLC no.: 9746357

Links
- Journal homepage; Online access; Online archive

The Clothing & Textiles Research Journal is a peer-reviewed academic journal that publishes papers in the field of Social Sciences. The journal's editor is Youn-Kyung Lydia Kim, Department of Retail, Hospitality, and Tourism Management, University of Tennessee, Knoxville. It has been in publication since 1982 and is currently published by SAGE Publications in association with the International Textiles and Apparel Association.

== Scope ==
The Clothing & Textiles Research Journal aims to inspire further research in clothing and textiles, providing scholars with resources. The interdisciplinary journal publishes articles in areas such as aesthetics and design, consumer theories and behavior, and historical and cultural aspects of dress.

== Abstracting and indexing ==
The Clothing & Textiles Research Journal is abstracted and indexed in, among other databases: SCOPUS, and the Social Sciences Citation Index. According to the Journal Citation Reports, its 2020 impact factor is 1.900, ranking it 59 out of 110 journals in the category 'Social Sciences, Interdisciplinary' and 131 out of 153 journals in the category 'Business'.
