= Journal of Functional Biomaterials =

- Discipline: Materials science
- Language: English
- Edited by: Pankaj Vadgama

Publication details
- History: 2010–present
- Publisher: MDPI
- Frequency: Continuous
- Open access: Yes
- License: Creative Commons Attribution License
- Impact factor: 4.8 (2022)

Standard abbreviations
- ISO 4: J. Funct. Biomater.

Indexing
- ISSN: 2079-4983
- OCLC no.: 760930427

Links
- Journal homepage

Journal of Functional Biomaterials is a peer-reviewed open-access scientific journal covering various aspects of biomaterials research. It is published by MDPI and was established in 2012. The editor-in-chief is Pankaj Vadgama (Queen Mary University of London).

The journal publishes research articles, reviews, and commentaries related to research, including nanomedicine, nanotechnology, and sensors for health.

== Abstracting and indexing ==
The journal is abstracted and indexed, for example, in:

- DOAJ
- ProQuest databases
- CAB Abstracts
- Science Citation Index Expanded
- Scopus

According to the Journal Citation Reports, the journal has a 2022 impact factor of 4.8.
