= Journal of Composite Materials =

- Discipline: Materials science
- Language: English
- Edited by: Mark Spearing

Publication details
- History: 1967–present
- Publisher: SAGE Publications
- Frequency: 28/year
- Impact factor: 2.4 (2024)

Standard abbreviations
- ISO 4: J. Compos. Mater.

Indexing
- CODEN: JCOMBI
- ISSN: 0021-9983 (print); 1530-793X (web)
- LCCN: 68007102
- OCLC no.: 6008630

Links
- Journal homepage; Online access; Online archive

The Journal of Composite Materials is a peer-reviewed scientific journal that covers the field of materials science. Its editor-in-chief is H.Thomas Hahn (UCLA). It was established in 1967 and is published by SAGE Publications in association with the American Society for Composites.

== Abstracting and indexing ==
The journal is abstracted and indexed in Scopus and the Science Citation Index Expanded. According to the Journal Citation Reports, its 2020 impact factor is 2.591, ranking it 18th out of 28 journals in the category "Materials Science, Composites".
