= Journal of Bioactive and Compatible Polymers =

- Discipline: Materials science
- Language: English
- Edited by: Kathryn Uhrich

Publication details
- History: 1986-present
- Publisher: SAGE Publications
- Frequency: Bimonthly
- Impact factor: 1.756 (2020)

Standard abbreviations
- ISO 4: J. Bioact. Compat. Polym.

Indexing
- CODEN: JBCPEV
- ISSN: 0883-9115 (print); 1530-8030 (web)
- LCCN: 93093542
- OCLC no.: 231044699

Links
- Journal homepage; Online access; Online archive

The Journal of Bioactive and Compatible Polymers is a bimonthly peer-reviewed scientific journal covering the field of materials science, especially the use of polymers in biomedicine. its editor-in-chief is Kathryn Uhrich (Rutgers University). The journal was established in 1986 and is published by SAGE Publications.

== Abstracting and indexing ==
The journal is abstracted and indexed in Scopus and the Science Citation Index Expanded. According to the Journal Citation Reports, its 2020 impact factor is 1.756, ranking it 141st out of 160 journals in the category "Biotechnology & Applied Microbiology", 37th out of 41 journals in the category "Materials Science, Biomaterials", and 69th out of 91 journals in the category "Polymer Science".
