= University of Saskatchewan College of Engineering =

Faculty at the University of Saskatchewan

College of Engineering at the University of Saskatchewan
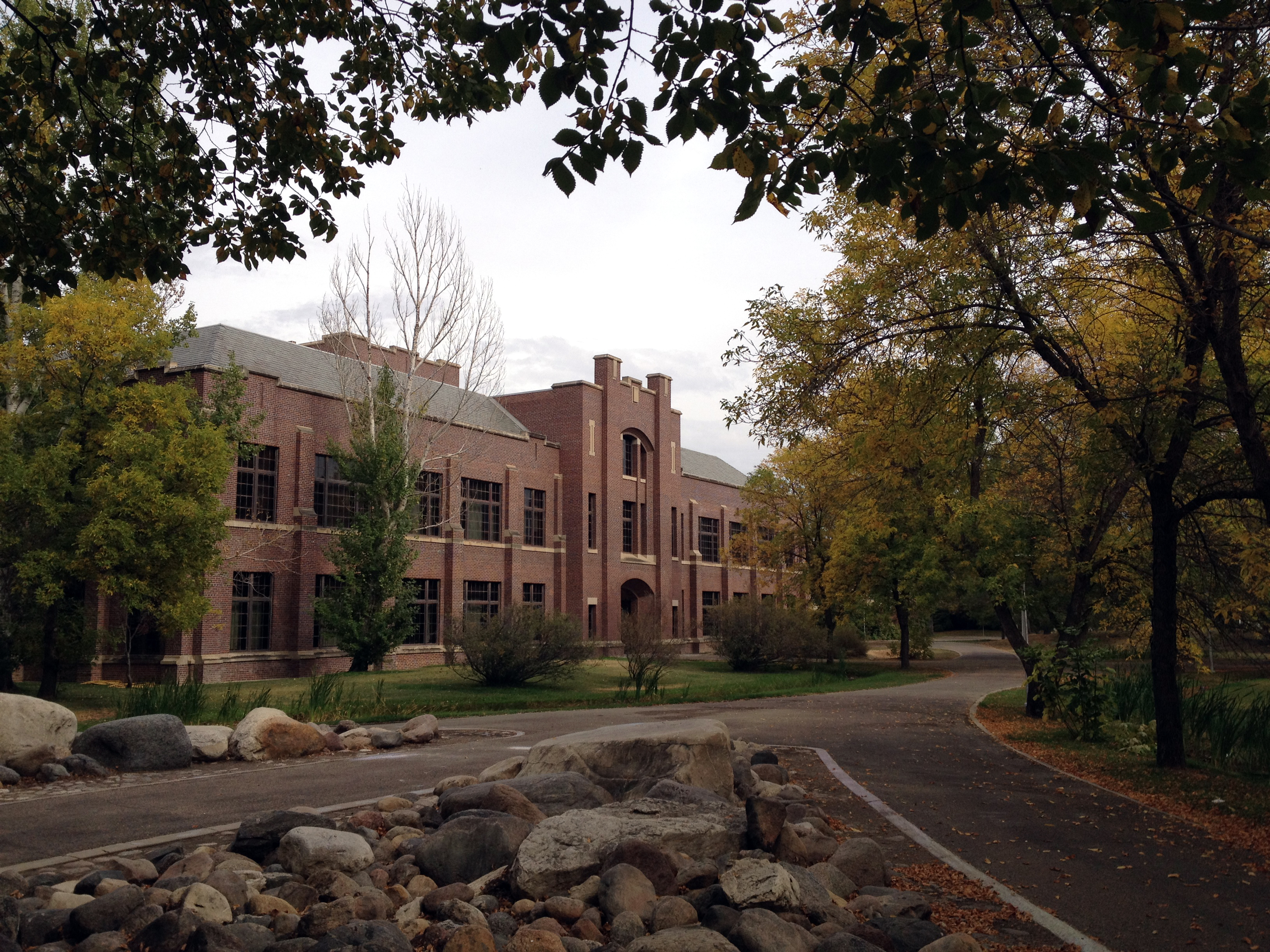
- Former name: School of Engineering
- Motto: Thorough
- Established: 1912 (114 years ago)
- Founder: C.J. Mackenzie
- Parent institution: University of Saskatchewan
- Dean: Michael Bradley, PhD (MIT), PEng
- Location: 57 Campus Drive, Saskatoon, Saskatchewan, Canada
- Colors: Red, black and white
- Website: engineering.usask.ca

The College of Engineering is a faculty at the University of Saskatchewan in Saskatoon, Saskatchewan, Canada.

"The College of Engineering is located on Treaty 6 Territory and the Homeland of the Métis, and we pay our respect to the First Nations and Métis ancestors of this place and reaffirm our relationship with one another."

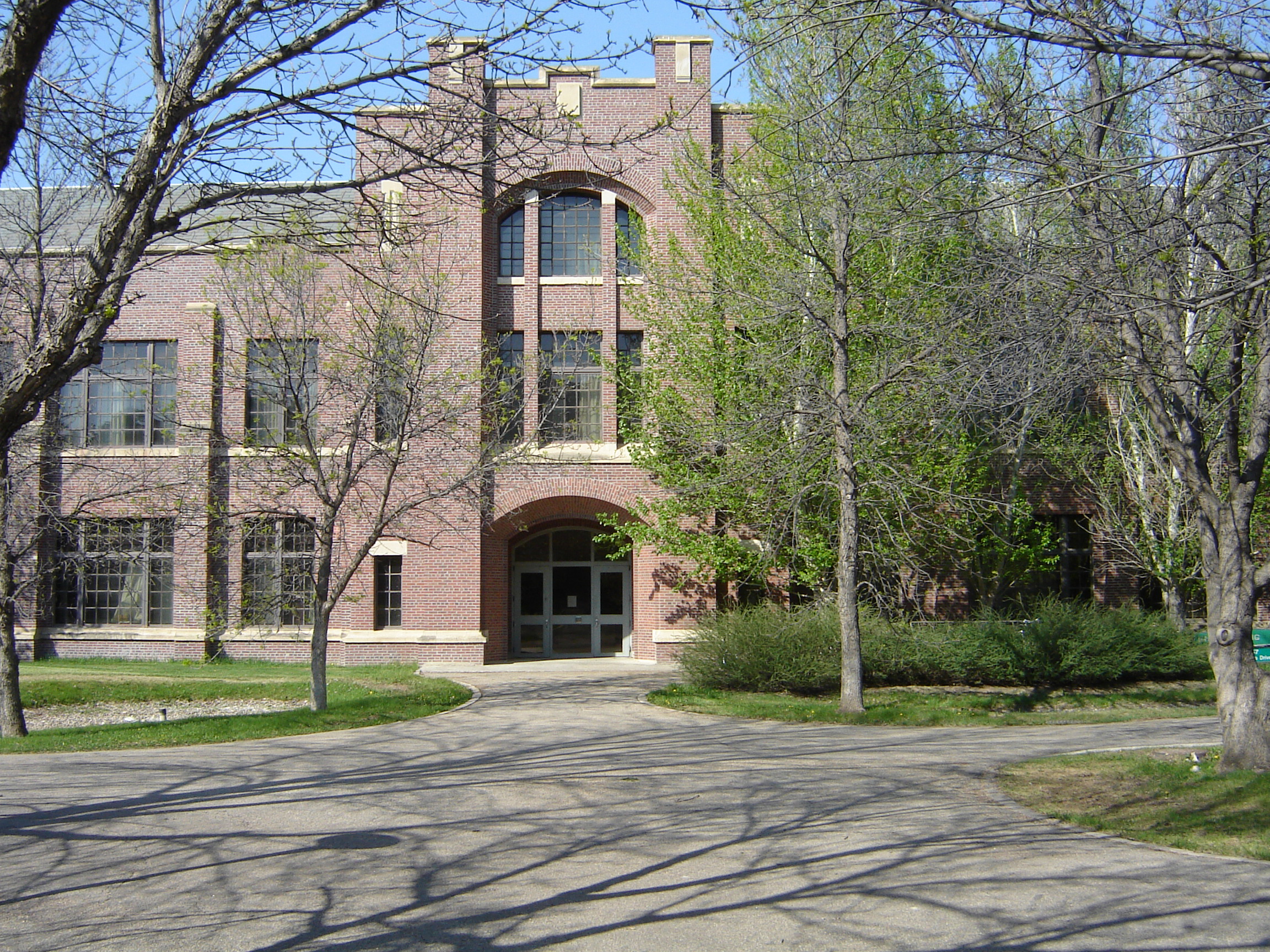
Engineering Building.

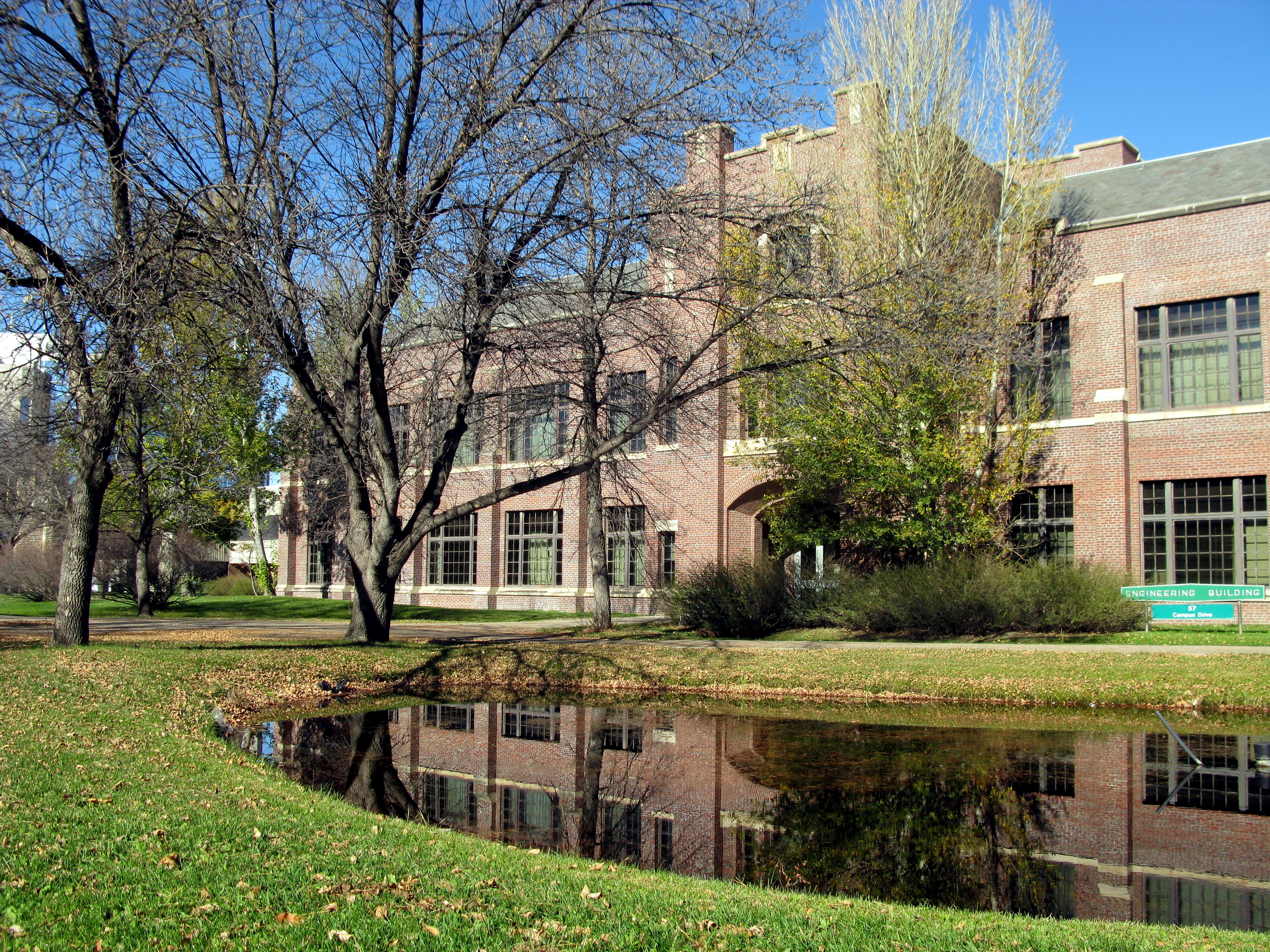
College of Engineering

== History ==
The "School of Engineering" officially started about five years after the University of Saskatchewan being established. In 1912, the University administrations decided to gather closely related courses under one title.

=== Early days ===
In 1912, the "School of Engineering" was founded. In that time, only civil engineering courses were offered to six students by Professor C.J. Mackenzie. The first Bachelors of Engineering degrees in civil engineering were awarded on April 26, 1916 to only three students.

October 28, 1920 marked the opening of the new engineering building. In 1925, a big fire destroyed the building. A new construction was built at the same place and it was opened in 1926.

=== The Great Depression and WWII ===
During the 30s, the tuition fees was raised. The College adopted the coat of arms, and new programs were incorporated (chemical engineering in 1931, and Geological and engineering physics in 1937).

The 1940s brought more changes, due to the value of engineering to war effort, the College became the largest on campus for the first time. The department of electrical engineering was created. At this time, the first female student graduated.

In 1952–53, petroleum engineering was introduced.

== Departments ==
- Chemical and Biological Engineering
- Civil, Geological and Environmental Engineering
- Electrical and Computer Engineering
- Mechanical Engineering
- Division of Biomedical Engineering

=== Degrees ===
- Biological Engineering (MSc and PhD)
- Biomedical Engineering (PGD, MEng, MSc, and PhD)
- Chemical Engineering (BE, MEng, MSc, and PhD)
- Civil Engineering (BE, MEng, MSc, and PhD)
- Computer Engineering (BE, dual BE & BSc, PGD, MEng, MSc, and PhD)
- Electrical Engineering (BE, dual BE & BSc, P.G.D, MEng, MSc, and PhD)
- Engineering Physics (BE, dual BE & BSc, MSc, and PhD)
- Environmental Engineering (BE)
- Geological Engineering (BE)
- Mechanical Engineering (BE, PGD, MEng, MSc, and PhD)

== Student groups ==
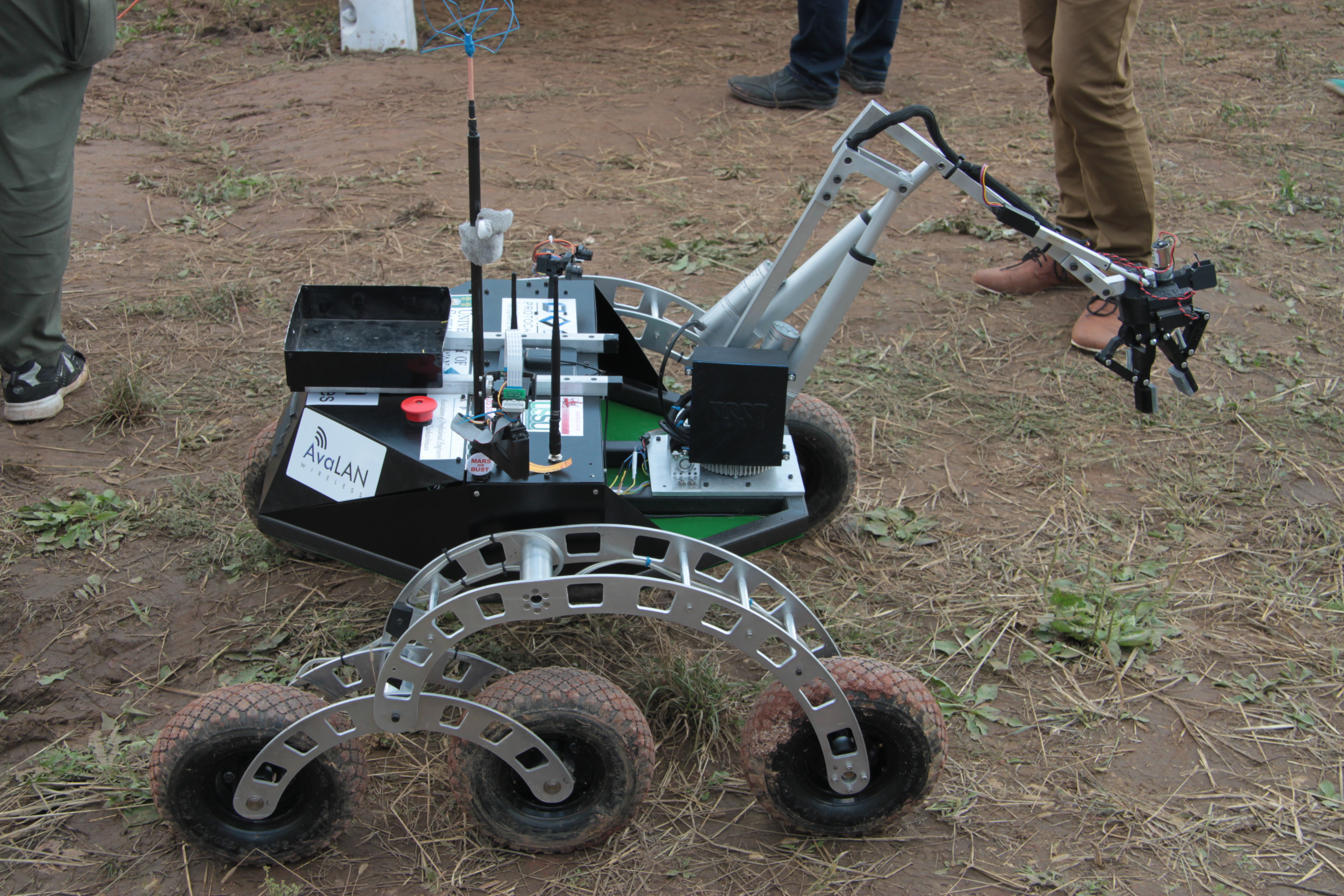
European Rover Challenge 2015, in Poland. First day of the competition, the winning rover built and run by the U of S Space Design Team (USST)

- Saskatoon Engineering Student Society (SESS)
- Engineering Graduate Course Council (EGCC)

=== Student discipline groups ===
- Chemical Engineering Student Society (ChESS)
- Civil Engineering Student Society (CSCE)
- Environmental Engineering Student Society (ENVESS)
- Geological Engineering Student Society (GESS)
- Institute of Electrical and Electronics Engineers (IEEE) Usask Student Chapter
- Mechanical Engineering Student Association (MESA)
- Physics Student Society (PSS)

=== Student design teams ===
- Huskie Formula Racing (SAE)
- Steel Bridge Design Team
- USask Aero Design Team
- USask Sled Dogs Quarter-Scale Tractor Team
- USask Space Design Team (USST)

== Faculty Members and staff ==
- Ajay Dalai,^{FRSC}, chemical
- Charles Colbourn, computer science
- C.J. Mackenzie,^{CC CMG MC FRS FRSC}, civil
- Ding Yu Peng, chemical
- Nabil Esmail, chemical
- Roy Billinton,^{FRSC}, electrical
- Safa Kasap, electrical

== Alumni ==
- Carson Morrison, P.Eng., Engineering Institute of Canada Fellow, Canadian Silver Jubilee Medal, Ontario Engineering Society Order of Honour, Canadian Standards Association Jean-Paul Carriere Award.
- C. Donald Bateman, BEng, inventor of the Ground Proximity Warning System (GPWS), a device that is responsible for a marked decline in controlled flight into terrain accidents.
- Daryl "Doc" Seaman, OC, BSc Mechanical Engineering, LL.D, honorary Doctor of Laws – businessman; one of the "100 Alumni of Influence" from the U of S
- H. D. Barber, BSc, MSc – founder of Electrical Engineering Canadian; CEO of Gennum Corporation
- Fred Mannering, BEng, Professor University of South Florida, Clarivate Highly Cited Researcher, member of the U.S. National Academy of Engineering
- Jim MacNeill, OC consultant, environmentalist, and international public servant
- M. F. Firouzabad, BEng, MSc, PhD, president of Sharif University of Technology
- W. Brett Wilson, BEng, MBA, Hon. LL.D., OC, S.O.M. – entrepreneur, philanthropist; former Dragon's Den panelist; co-founder of FirstEnergy Capital; founder, President, and Chairman of Prairie Merchant Capital; Chairman of Canoe Financial

== See also ==
- Academic programs at the University of Saskatchewan
- List of universities in Canada § Saskatchewan
