= Journal of Materials Science: Materials in Electronics =

- Discipline: Materials Science, engineering
- Language: English
- Edited by: Safa Kasap

Publication details
- History: 1990-present
- Publisher: Springer Science+Business Media
- Frequency: Monthly
- Impact factor: 3.2 (2025)

Standard abbreviations
- ISO 4: J. Mater. Sci.: Mater. Electron.

Indexing
- CODEN: JSMEEV
- ISSN: 0957-4522 (print); 1573-482X (web)
- LCCN: 90641002
- OCLC no.: 21581688

Links
- Journal homepage; Online access

The Journal of Materials Science: Materials in Electronics is a peer-reviewed scientific journal published by Springer Science+Business Media. It is an offshoot of the Journal of Materials Science, focusing specifically on materials used in electronics. The editor-in-chief is Safa Kasap (University of Saskatchewan, Canada).

== History ==
This journal was originally published quarterly by Chapman & Hall from May 1990. This frequency was changed to six issues per year from 1994 to 1998, and then nine issues per year from 1999 to 2000. From 2001, the journal has been published monthly.

== Abstracting and indexing ==
The journal is abstracted and indexed in:

- Academic OneFile
- Chemical Abstracts Service
- ChemWeb
- Compendex
- CSA/Proquest
- Current Contents Collections/Electronics & Telecommunications Collections
- Current Contents/Engineering
- Computing and Technology
- Current Contents/Physical, Chemical and Earth Sciences
- Glassfile Database
- INIS Atomindex
- Materials Science Citation Index
- OmniFile
- PASCAL database
- Polymer Library
- Science Citation Index
- Scopus
- TOC Premier
- VINITI Database RAS

According to the Journal Citation Reports, the journal has a 2020 impact factor of 2.478.

== See also ==
- Advanced Functional Materials
- ECS Digital Library
- Journal of Electroceramics
- Journal of Electronic Materials
- Metamaterials (journal)
