= Mechanics of Advanced Composite Structures =

- Discipline: Composite structures
- Language: English
- Edited by: Abdoulhossein Fereidoon

Publication details
- History: 2014–present
- Publisher: Semnan University (Iran)
- Frequency: Biannual
- Open access: Yes
- License: CC BY 4.0

Standard abbreviations
- ISO 4: Mech. Adv. Compos. Struct.

Indexing
- ISSN: 2423-4826 (print); 2423-7043 (web)

Links
- Journal homepage; Online access; Online archive

Mechanics of Advanced Composite Structures is a biannual peer-reviewed open-access scientific journal published by Semnan University. The editor-in-chief is Abdoulhossein Fereidoon (Semnan University). The journal covers all aspects of research on composite structures. It was established in 2014 and is abstracted and indexed in Scopus.
