= Journal of Materials Science: Materials in Medicine =

- Discipline: Materials science
- Language: English
- Edited by: Luigi Ambrosio

Publication details
- History: 1990-present
- Publisher: Springer Science+Business Media
- Frequency: Monthly
- Impact factor: 3.896 (2020)

Standard abbreviations
- ISO 4: J. Mater. Sci.: Mater. Med.
- NLM: J Mater Sci Mater Med

Indexing
- CODEN: JSMMEL
- ISSN: 0957-4530 (print); 1573-4838 (web)
- LCCN: 91642022
- OCLC no.: 21929562

Links
- Journal homepage

The Journal of Materials Science: Materials in Medicine is a peer-reviewed scientific journal published by Springer Science+Business Media. It is an offshoot of the Journal of Materials Science, focusing specifically on materials in medicine and dentistry. The founding editor in chief was William Bonfield; the current editor-in-chief is Luigi Ambrosio (National Research Council (CNR) Naples, Italy).

According to the Journal Citation Reports, the Journal of Materials Science: Materials in Medicine has a 2020 impact factor of 3.896.

== Scope ==
The journal's content focusses on the development of synthetic and natural materials for orthopaedic, maxillofacial, cardiovascular, neurological, ophthalmic and dental applications. Further, biocompatibility studies, nanomedicine, studies on regenerative medicine, computer modelling, and other advanced experimental methodologies are included.
