= Journal of Sol-Gel Science and Technology =

- Discipline: Physics, chemistry
- Language: English
- Edited by: Michel A. Aegerter

Publication details
- History: 1993-present
- Publisher: Springer Science+Business Media
- Frequency: Monthly
- Impact factor: 2.3 (2023)

Standard abbreviations
- ISO 4: J. Sol-Gel Sci. Technol.

Indexing
- CODEN: JSGTEC
- ISSN: 0928-0707 (print); 1573-4846 (web)
- LCCN: 96659003
- OCLC no.: 38266765

Links
- Journal homepage

The Journal of Sol-Gel Science and Technology is a monthly peer-reviewed scientific journal covering research on sol-gel materials. Recent findings on new products developed via chemical nanotechnology are also included.

According to the Journal Citation Reports, the Journal of Sol-Gel Science and Technology has a 2023 impact factor of 2.3. It is the official journal of the International Sol-Gel Society.

== Abstracting and indexing ==
The journal is abstracted and indexed in:

- Chemical Abstracts Service
- ChemWeb
- Materials Science Citation Index
- Scopus
- Academic OneFile
- Chemical Engineering and Biotechnology Abstracts
- Current Contents/Engineering, Computing and Technology
- Earthquake Engineering Abstracts
- EBSCO databases
- EI-Compendex
- Engineered Materials Abstracts
- INIS Atomindex
- Inspec
- PASCAL
- Polymer Library
- ProQuest
- Science Citation Index
- VINITI Database RAS
