= International Journal of Damage Mechanics =

- Discipline: Engineering
- Language: English
- Edited by: Chi L.Chow

Publication details
- History: 1992-present
- Publisher: SAGE Publications
- Frequency: 8/year
- Impact factor: 3.125 (2 years) (2019)

Standard abbreviations
- ISO 4: Int. J. Damage Mech.

Indexing
- CODEN: IDMEEH
- ISSN: 1056-7895 (print); 1530-7921 (web)
- LCCN: 92640135
- OCLC no.: 44486409

Links
- Journal homepage; Online access; Online archive

The International Journal of Damage Mechanics is a peer-reviewed scientific journal covering the fields of engineering and materials science. The editor-in-chief is Chi L. Chow (University of Michigan). It was established in 1992 and is published by SAGE Publications.

== Abstracting and indexing ==
The journal is abstracted and indexed in Academic Search Premier, Current Contents, the Material Science Citation Index, Mechanical Engineering Abstracts, Scopus, and the Science Citation Index Expanded. According to the Journal Citation Reports, its 2019 impact factor is 3.125 (2 years), ranking it 126 out of 314 journals in the category "Materials Science, Multidisciplinary" and 31st out of 136 journals in the category "Mechanics".
