= Journal of Plastic Film and Sheeting =

- Discipline: Plastics
- Language: English
- Edited by: John R. Wagner, Jr.

Publication details
- History: 1985-present
- Publisher: SAGE Publications
- Frequency: Quarterly
- Impact factor: 2.750 (2020)

Standard abbreviations
- ISO 4: J. Plast. Film Sheeting

Indexing
- CODEN: JPFSEH
- ISSN: 8756-0879 (print); 1530-8014 (web)
- LCCN: sf96090652
- OCLC no.: 612986832

Links
- Journal homepage; Online access; Online archive

The Journal of Plastic Film and Sheeting is a peer-reviewed scientific journal that covers the field of materials science, especially the development and processing of plastic film and sheeting. The editors-in-chief are John R. Wagner Jr. and James P. Harrington. It was established in 1985 and is published by SAGE Publications.

== Abstracting and indexing ==
The journal is abstracted and indexed in Scopus, and the Science Citation Index Expanded. According to the Journal Citation Reports, its 2020 impact factor is 2.750, ranking it 12th out of 21 journals in the category "Materials Science, Coatings & Films".
