= The Journal of the Textile Institute =

The Journal of The Textile Institute
- Discipline: Textile research
- Language: English
- Edited by: Xungai Wang, Xiaogang Chen

Publication details
- History: 1910–present
- Publisher: Taylor & Francis on behalf of the Textile Institute (United Kingdom)
- Frequency: 12/year
- Open access: Hybrid
- Impact factor: 1.8 (2023)

Standard abbreviations
- ISO 4: J. Text. Inst.

Indexing
- ISSN: 0040-5000 (print); 1754-2340 (web)
- LCCN: 2010233164
- OCLC no.: 973873512

Links
- Journal homepage; Online access; Online archive

The Journal of The Textile Institute is a peer-reviewed scientific journal that covers research and advancements in the field of textile science and textile engineering. The journal's editor-in-chief is Xungai Wang. It was established in 1910 and is published by Taylor & Francis on behalf of the Textile Institute, a professional body for individuals working in textiles, clothing, and footwear industries.

== Abstracting and indexing ==
The journal is abstracted and indexed in major databases including Inspec,Scopus, Web of Science, and Google Scholar.

According to the Journal Citation Reports, the journal has a 2023 impact factor of 1.8.
