= MRS Advances =

Scientific journal

- Discipline: Materials science
- Language: English
- Edited by: David F. Bahr

Publication details
- History: 2016—present
- Publisher: Springer, Materials Research Society
- Frequency: Irregular
- Impact factor: 1.2 (2025)

Standard abbreviations
- ISO 4: MRS Adv.

Indexing
- ISSN: 2731-5894 (print); 2059-8521 (web)

Links
- Journal homepage; Online access; Online archive

MRS Advances is a peer-reviewed and online-only scientific journal published by Springer Science+Business Media on behalf of Materials Research Society. Established in 2016 and published by Cambridge University Press until 2021, it focuses on rapid publications and topical issues in materials science and engineering. Its current editor-in-chief is David F. Bahr (Purdue University).

== Abstracting and indexing ==
The journal is abstracted and indexed in:

- EBSCO databases
- Emerging Sources Citation Index
- Ei Compendex
- Inspec
- ProQuest databases
- Scopus

According to the Journal Citation Reports, the journal has a 2025 impact factor of 1.2.
