= Proceedings of Higher Education Institutions. Textile Industry Technology =

- Discipline: Textile engineering, materials science
- Language: English, Russian
- Edited by: Evgeniy Vladimirovich Rumyantsev

Publication details
- History: 1957–present
- Frequency: Bimonthly

Standard abbreviations
- ISO 4: Proc. High. Educ. Inst., Text. Ind. Technol.

Indexing
- CODEN: IVTTAF
- ISSN: 0021-3497
- LCCN: 61029772
- OCLC no.: 4068380

Links
- Journal homepage; Online archive

The Proceedings of Higher Education Institutions. Textile Industry Technology (Russian: Известия высших учебных заведений. Технология текстильной промышленности) is a bimonthly peer-reviewed scientific journal covering research on textile and light industry technology. It was established in 1957 and publishes studies on innovations in textile production processes, the development of new materials, ecological and energy-saving technologies, and engineering applications in textile manufacturing.

== Abstracting and indexing ==
The journal is abstracted and indexed in the Russian Science Citation Index, Scopus, and Chemical Abstracts Service.
