= Journal of Industrial Textiles =

- Discipline: Materials science
- Language: English
- Edited by: Dong Zhang

Publication details
- Former name: Journal of Coated Fabrics
- History: 1971-present
- Publisher: SAGE Publications
- Frequency: Quarterly
- Impact factor: 3.732 (2020)

Standard abbreviations
- ISO 4: J. Ind. Text.

Indexing
- CODEN: JINTFC
- ISSN: 1528-0837 (print); 1530-8057 (web)
- LCCN: 00211432
- OCLC no.: 44487227

Links
- Journal homepage; Online archive

The Journal of Industrial Textiles is a peer-reviewed scientific journal that covers materials science as applied to textiles. Its editor-in-chief is Dong Zhang . It was established in 1971 and is published by SAGE Publications.

== Abstracting and indexing ==
The journal is abstracted and indexed in Scopus and the Science Citation Index Expanded. According to the Journal Citation Reports, its 2020 impact factor is 3.732, ranking it 4th out of 25 journals in the category "Materials Science, Textiles".
