= Journal of Materials Science =

- Discipline: Materials science
- Language: English
- Edited by: C. Barry Carter

Publication details
- History: 1966–present
- Publisher: Springer
- Frequency: Weekly
- Open access: Hybrid
- Impact factor: 3.5 (2023)

Standard abbreviations
- ISO 4: J. Mater. Sci.

Indexing
- CODEN: JMTSAS
- ISSN: 0022-2461 (print); 1573-4803 (web)
- LCCN: 78211246
- OCLC no.: 21929562

Links
- Journal homepage; Online archive

The Journal of Materials Science is a weekly peer-reviewed scientific journal covering all aspects of materials science. It was established in 1966 by Robert W. Cahn and is published by Springer Science+Business Media. The journal incorporated Journal of Materials Science Letters in 2003 and Interface Science in 2004. The Editor-in-Chief was C. Barry Carter (University of Connecticut).

In 2012, the journal announced an annual "Cahn Prize" for best paper published in the journal, in honor of its founding editor. In 2021, the journal announced a similar annual "Bonfield Prize" for best review paper published in the journal, in honor of a former Editor-in-Chief, William Bonfield. There are two more specialized sister journals, Journal of Materials Science: Materials in Medicine and Journal of Materials Science: Materials in Electronics.

== Abstracting and indexing ==
The journal is abstracted and indexed in:

- Academic OneFile
- Aquatic Sciences and Fisheries Abstracts
- Chemical Engineering and Biotechnology Abstracts
- Chemical Abstracts Service
- Cambridge Scientific Abstracts
- Current Contents/Engineering, Computing & Technology
- Current Contents/Physical, Chemical & Earth Sciences
- EBSCO databases
- Ei Compendex
- GeoRef
- INIS Atomindex
- Materials Science Citation Index
- PASCAL
- Polymer Library
- ProQuest databases
- Science Citation Index
- Scopus
- VINITI Database RAS

According to the Journal Citation Reports, the journal has a 2020 impact factor of 4.220, ranking it 82nd out of 293 journals in the category "Materials Science, Multidisciplinary".

== See also ==
- Journal of Materials Science Letters
