= Fred Manget =

American physician

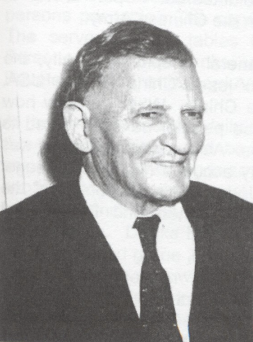
- Born: Fred Prosper Manget; 21 January 1880; Marietta, Georgia, US
- Died: 21 January 1979 (aged 99); Atlanta, Georgia, US
- Occupations: surgeon, doctor, medical missionary
- Known for: Huzhou General Hospital

Fred Prosper Manget (21 January 1880 – 21 January 1979) was an American doctor, public servant, and medical missionary. He served for forty years in China from 1909 until the end of World War II. In 1909 Manget left the U.S. for China to pursue missionary work. He received recognition from state and local organizations for his service to the poor and elderly and for his Christian humanitarian efforts abroad. Manget is most notable for founding the Huzhou General Hospital in China. Huzhou General Hospital is specifically noted for its role in spreading western medical practices to northern China. He ran several clinics and dispensaries in his mission work as well as at home in the state of Georgia.

== Early life ==
Manget was born on 21 January 1880 to Elizabeth DePass and Victor Eugene Manget of Marietta, Georgia. He graduated with a degree in medicine from the Atlanta College of Physicians and Surgeons (now Emory University School of Medicine) in 1906. He interned at Grady Hospital in Atlanta and did postgraduate work at Johns Hopkins University.

== Missionary career ==
=== Early years in China ===
In 1909 Manget left for China to pursue missionary work. During his first year, he was stationed in Suzhou, a major city in the southeastern Jiangsu province of East China. He later went to Huzhou, located within the very small province of Zhejiang, China, where he opened a dispensary in a rented property. This dispensary became the first hospital established in Huzhou, China. In 1918, he worked as Head Medical Officer for the American Red Cross in Siberia and was honored by the Kolchak government. After his return to China, he opened a 200-bed hospital in May 1924 with support from the US government. He ran both establishments until 1941.

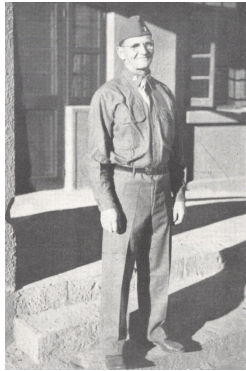
Fred Prosper Manget in Kunming, China

=== World War II ===
Manget was asked to serve in the United States Public Health Commission as Senior Surgeon on Field Duty, during World War II. During his time as commissioner, he served in Burma and West China as a missionary aide to people with malaria. In 1941 he was asked to treat patients with malaria at the request of Chiang Kaishek, the Former President of the Republic of China. After Burma fell to the Japanese, he was later transferred to an area in southwest China called Kunming. In Kunming, Manget worked alongside General Claire Lee Chennault and the First American Volunteer Group of the Chinese Air Force, better known as the Flying Tigers. While working with the "Flying Tigers", Manget met Robert Lee Scott Jr., a colonel in the U.S. Army Air Force during the war. Via Scott, Manget coined the term "God is my co-pilot". This term later became the title of Scott's autobiography, which discussed his journeys as a pilot during World War II with the Flying Tigers and U.S. Air Force.

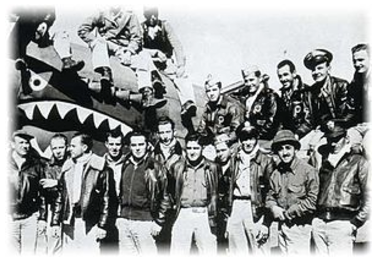
Flying Tigers

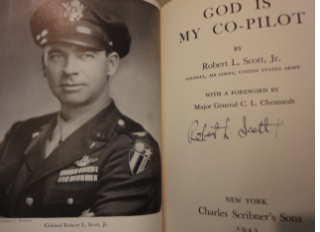
Colonel Robert Lee Scott Jr. and his book “God is My Co-Pilot

Nurse Rebecca Chan Chung worked under Manget in Kunming.

=== Huzhou General Hospital ===
At the end of World War I, Dr. Manget returned to Shanghai and discussed with the representative of The Rockefeller Foundation in China about the foundation's intention to spread the practice of Western medicine in China. After much negotiation, the Chinese Government agreed to provide nine acres of land, while the foundation provided US$30,000 to build a hospital in Huzhou. The remaining needed funds for the project were provided by the Southern Methodist Church and the Northern Baptist Church in the US.

Huzhou General Hospital was a small hospital in a small rented building. It was first established with Dr. Manget as the only physician, later encompassing nine acres of land, and with a staff of over 100 nurses and 100 other personnel. It was noted for having the most modern medical facilities in China. The facilities of the hospital included a chemistry laboratory, an X-ray facility and a nursing school. Japanese troops later occupied the hospital. During this time, Manget's family left China. However, Dr. Manget was not willing to leave China because of the harsh treatment of the Chinese people by the Japanese. As a result of pointing out these injustices, he was arrested by Japanese troops, who wrongly accused him of espionage. Manget was later released and was able to work under the strict control of the Japanese troops at Huzhou General Hospital for an additional three and a half years.

== Personal life ==
Manget's first wife was Louise Anderson. Fred and Louise had four daughters during their time in China, Elizabeth DePasse Manget in 1910, Jean Logan Manget in 1912, Louise and Mildred Bomar Manget in 1920. Anderson later died in 1957. He later remarried Jennie Loyall Anderson of Macon, Georgia in 1959. His second wife died in 1976. Dr. Manget was later admitted to Wesley Woods Health Center in Atlanta in 1978. Manget died on 21 January 1979.
