= Journal of the European Ceramic Society =

- Discipline: Materials science, ceramics
- Language: English
- Edited by: Richard Todd

Publication details
- Former name(s): International Journal of High Technology Ceramics
- History: 1985-present
- Publisher: Elsevier on behalf of the European Ceramic Society
- Frequency: 16/year (monthly + extra special issues)
- Open access: Hybrid
- Impact factor: 5.7 (2022)

Standard abbreviations
- ISO 4: J. Eur. Ceram. Soc.

Indexing
- ISSN: 0955-2219
- LCCN: 97657497
- OCLC no.: 780547428

Links
- Journal homepage; Online archive

The Journal of the European Ceramic Society is a monthly peer-reviewed scientific journal published by Elsevier on behalf of the European Ceramic Society. It covers research related to conventional categories of ceramic: structural, functional, traditional or composite. It was established in 1985 as the International Journal of High Technology Ceramics, obtaining its current name in 1989.

== Abstracting and indexing ==
This journal is abstracted and indexed in:

- Ceramics Abstracts
- Current Contents/Engineering, Computing & Technology
- Current Contents/Physical, Chemical & Earth Sciences
- FLUIDEX
- Materials Science Citation Index
- Inspec
- Science Citation Index Expanded
- Scopus

According to the Journal Citation Reports, the journal has a 2022 impact factor of 5.7.
