= Materials Research Letters =

- Discipline: Materials science
- Language: English
- Edited by: Yuntian T. Zhu, Quanxi Jia

Publication details
- History: 2013-present
- Publisher: Taylor & Francis
- Frequency: Quarterly
- Open access: Yes
- Impact factor: 7.323 (2020)

Standard abbreviations
- ISO 4: Mater. Res. Lett.

Indexing
- ISSN: 2166-3831

Links
- Journal homepage

Materials Research Letters is an open-access, peer-reviewed scientific journal, targeted to be a high impact, fast communication letters journal for the materials research community. It was established in 2013. According to the Journal Citation Reports, the journal has a 2020 impact factor of 7.323.
