= Applied Surface Science =

Scientific journal

- Discipline: Surface science
- Language: English
- Edited by: Jennifer Strunk

Publication details
- Former name: Applications of Surface Science (1977—1985)
- History: 1977—present
- Publisher: Elsevier
- Frequency: Bimonthly
- Impact factor: 6.6 (2025)

Standard abbreviations
- ISO 4: Appl. Surf. Sci.

Indexing
- CODEN: ASUSEE
- ISSN: 0169-4332 (print); 1873-5584 (web)

Links
- Journal homepage; Online access; Online archive

Applied Surface Science is a peer-reviewed scientific journal published bimonthly by Elsevier. Established in 1977 under the name Applications of Surface Science, it covers surface and interface science as well as its applications in materials science and engineering. Its current editor-in-chief is Jennifer Strunk (Technical University of Munich).

== Abstracting and indexing ==
The journal is abstracted and indexed in:

- Chemical Abstracts Core
- Current Contents/Engineering, Computing & Technology
- Current Contents/Physical, Chemical & Earth Sciences
- EBSCO databases
- Ei Compendex
- Inspec
- Science Citation Index Expanded
- Scopus

According to the Journal Citation Reports, the journal has a 2025 impact factor of 6.6.
