= Materials Today =

- Discipline: Materials science
- Language: English
- Edited by: Jun Lou, Gleb Yushin

Publication details
- History: 1998-present
- Publisher: Elsevier
- Frequency: Monthly
- Impact factor: 24.1 (2025)

Standard abbreviations
- ISO 4: Mater. Today

Indexing
- CODEN: MTOUAN
- ISSN: 1369-7021
- LCCN: 2001261059
- OCLC no.: 49407176

Links
- Journal homepage; Journal page at publisher's website; Online access

Materials Today is a monthly peer-reviewed scientific journal, website, and journal family. The parent journal was established in 1998 and covers all aspects of materials science. It is published by Elsevier and the editors-in-chief are Jun Lou (Rice University) and Gleb Yushin (Georgia Institute of Technology). The journal principally publishes invited review articles, but other formats are also included, such as primary research articles, news items, commentaries, and opinion pieces on subjects of interest to the field. The website publishes news, educational webinars, podcasts, and blogs, as well as a jobs and events board. According to the Journal Citation Reports, the journal has a 2025 impact factor of 24.1.

The journal family includes Applied Materials Today, Materials Today Chemistry, Materials Today Energy, Materials Today Physics, Materials Today Nano, Materials Today Sustainability, Materials Today Communications, Materials Today Advances and Materials Today: Proceedings; as well as an extended collection of related publications.

== History ==
The journal was established in 1998 as a collaboration between Elsevier and the European Materials Research Society. The founding editor was Phil Mestecky. The journal was distributed free of charge to society members and to anyone else who requested a subscription. The spin-off titles Materials Today Communications, Materials Today: Proceedings, and Applied Materials Today were launched between 2014 and 2015. In October 2016, Materials Today announced plans to further develop the journal and related family: including the appointment of new editors, the inclusion of primary research articles, and the planned launch of an extended family of titles. The journal transitioned into an open access publication in 2012 but announced the introduction of subscription articles alongside open-access articles from 2017.
