= Fibre Chemistry =

- Discipline: Materials science, textile
- Language: English
- Edited by: N. N. Machalaba

Publication details
- History: 1969–present
- Publisher: Springer Science+Business Media
- Frequency: Bimonthly
- Impact factor: 0.5 (2023)

Standard abbreviations
- ISO 4: Fibre Chem.

Indexing
- CODEN: FICYAP
- ISSN: 0015-0541 (print); 1573-8493 (web)
- LCCN: sf78000623
- OCLC no.: 1071084600

Links
- Journal homepage; Online archive

Fibre Chemistry is a bimonthly peer-reviewed scientific journal that covers the chemistry, technology, and applications of man-made fibers. It is the English translation of the Russian journal Khimicheskie Volokna (Химические Волокна) and publishes research covering the synthesis, properties, and industrial applications of synthetic fibers. It is published by Springer Science+Business Media and the editor-in-chief is Nikolay N. Matchalaba (Russian Academy of Engineering). The journal publishes both original research and review articles on textiles and materials science more in general.

== Abstracting and indexing ==
The journal is abstracted and indexed in:

- Chemical Abstracts Service
- EBSCO databases
- EI Compendex
- Inspec
- ProQuest databases
- Scopus
- Science Citation Index Expanded

According to the Journal Citation Reports, the journal has a 2023 impact factor of 0.5.
