= Journal of Physics and Chemistry of Solids =

- Discipline: Condensed matter physics
- Language: English
- Edited by: M. Azuma, A. Bansil, H.-P. Cheng, K. Prassides, L. Malavasi

Publication details
- Former names: Physics and Chemistry of Solids, International Journal of Physics and Chemistry of Solids
- History: 1957–present
- Publisher: Elsevier
- Frequency: Monthly
- Impact factor: 5.9 (2025)

Standard abbreviations
- ISO 4: J. Phys. Chem. Solids

Indexing
- CODEN: JPCSAW
- ISSN: 0022-3697
- LCCN: 94647938
- OCLC no.: 644501948

Links
- Journal homepage; Online access

Journal of Physics and Chemistry of Solids is a peer-reviewed scientific journal of condensed matter physics and material science. The journal is edited by M. Azuma, A. Bansil, H.-P. Cheng, and K. Prassides. The journal was established in 1957 by Harvey Brooks, and is published monthly by Elsevier.

In 1963 the Letters section of the journal split to form Solid State Communications.

== Abstracting and indexing ==
The journal is abstracted and indexed in the following databases:

- Cambridge Scientific Abstracts
- Chemical Abstracts
- Current Contents/Engineering, Computing & Technology
- Materials Science Citation Index
- EIC/Intelligence
- Engineering Index
- INSPEC
- PASCAL
- SSSA/CISA/ECA/ISMEC
- Scopus
