= Crystallography Reviews =

- Discipline: Crystallography
- Language: English
- Edited by: Petra Bombicz

Publication details
- History: 1987-present
- Publisher: Taylor & Francis
- Frequency: Quarterly
- Impact factor: 2.467 (2020)

Standard abbreviations
- ISO 4: Crystallogr. Rev.

Indexing
- CODEN: CRRVEN
- ISSN: 0889-311X (print); 1476-3508 (web)
- LCCN: 87640399
- OCLC no.: 50409833

Links
- Journal homepage

Crystallography Reviews is a quarterly peer-reviewed scientific journal publishing review articles on all aspects of crystallography. It is published by Taylor & Francis. The editor-in-chief is Petra Bombicz.

== Abstracting and indexing ==
The journal is abstracted and indexed in:

- Chemical Abstracts Service/CASSI
- Science Citation Index Expanded
- Scopus

According to the Journal Citation Reports, the journal has a 2020 impact factor of 2.467.
