= Macromolecular Reaction Engineering =

- Discipline: Polymer reaction engineering
- Language: English
- Edited by: Stefan Spiegel

Publication details
- History: 2007-present
- Publisher: Wiley-VCH
- Frequency: Monthly
- Open access: Hybrid
- Impact factor: 1.931 (2020)

Standard abbreviations
- ISO 4: Macromol. React. Eng.

Indexing
- CODEN: MREAD4
- ISSN: 1862-832X (print); 1862-8338 (web)
- OCLC no.: 80014454

Links
- Journal homepage; Online access; Online archive

Macromolecular Reaction Engineering is a peer-reviewed scientific journal published monthly by Wiley-VCH. The journal covers academic and industrial research in the field of polymer reaction engineering, which includes polymer science. It emerged from a section that was part of Macromolecular Materials and Engineering. The journal publishes reviews, feature articles, communications, and full papers in the entire field of polymer reaction engineering, including polymer reaction modeling, reactor optimization, and control. Its 2020 impact factor is 1.931.

The journal also produces special issues. The 2009 and 2010 topics included "New Frontiers in Polymer Engineering" and "Controlled Radical Polymerization".

== Aims and scope ==
Macromolecular Reaction Engineering is intended for polymer scientists, chemists, physicists, materials scientists, theoreticians, and chemical engineers. The journal covers recent and significant results of academic and industrial research in the field of interest, encompassing all related topics - this includes polymer reaction modeling, reactor optimization and control, polyolefins, polymer production, sensors, process control, polymers, macromolecular materials, polymer reaction engineering, modelling, reactor optimization, polymeric materials, and polymer engineering.

== Abstracting and indexing ==
The journal is abstracted and indexed in Chemical Abstracts Service, Chemistry Citation Index, Compendex, Current Contents/Engineering, Computing & Technology, Current Contents/Physical, Chemical & Earth Sciences, Inspec, Journal Citation Reports/Science Edition, Materials Science Citation Index, and the Science Citation Index Expanded.
