= Carbon (journal) =

- Discipline: Materials science
- Language: English
- Edited by: Mauricio Terrones

Publication details
- History: 1964-present
- Publisher: Elsevier
- Frequency: 15/year
- Impact factor: 12.7 (2025)

Standard abbreviations
- ISO 4: Carbon

Indexing
- ISSN: 0008-6223
- LCCN: 65008336
- OCLC no.: 1926664

Links
- Journal homepage

Carbon is a scientific journal published by Elsevier. According to the journal's website, "Carbon publishes papers that deal with original research on carbonaceous solids with an emphasis on graphene-based materials. These materials include, but are not limited to, carbon nanotubes, carbon fibers and filaments, graphites, activated carbons, pyrolytic carbons, glass-like carbons, carbon blacks, and chars."

The Editor-in-Chief is Mauricio Terrones of Penn State University (USA) and the Senior Editor is Gareth Neighbour of the Open University (UK) and these are supported by an editorial board of 14 carbon scientists.
