= Macromolecular Theory and Simulations =

- Discipline: Polymer science
- Language: English
- Edited by: Stefan Spiegel

Publication details
- History: 1992-present
- Publisher: Wiley-VCH
- Frequency: 9/year
- Impact factor: 1.530 (2020)

Standard abbreviations
- ISO 4: Macromol. Theory Simul.

Indexing
- CODEN: MTHSEK
- ISSN: 1022-1344 (print); 1521-3919 (web)
- LCCN: 94652060
- OCLC no.: 613411322

Links
- Journal homepage; Online access; Online archive

Macromolecular Theory and Simulations is a peer-reviewed scientific journal covering polymer science. It publishes Reviews, Feature Articles, Communications, and Full Papers on all aspects from macromolecular theory to advanced computer simulation. According to the Journal Citation Reports, the journal has a 2020 impact factor of 1.530.
