= Materials Chemistry and Physics =

- Discipline: Materials science
- Language: English
- Edited by: S.L.I. Chan, K-L. Lin

Publication details
- History: 1983-present
- Publisher: Elsevier (Taiwan)
- Frequency: 18/year
- Impact factor: 4.6 (2022)

Standard abbreviations
- ISO 4: Mater. Chem. Phys.

Indexing
- CODEN: MCHPDR
- ISSN: 0254-0584
- LCCN: 96660084
- OCLC no.: 613315777

Links
- Journal homepage; Online access

Materials Chemistry and Physics (including Materials Science Communications) is a peer-reviewed scientific journal published 18 times per year by Elsevier. The focus of the journal is interrelationships among structure, properties, processing and performance of materials. It covers conventional and advanced materials. Publishing formats are short communications, full-length papers and feature articles. The editor-in-chief is Jenq-Gong Duh (National Tsing Hua University).

According to the Journal Citation Reports, the journal has a 2022 impact factor of 4.6, ranking it 57th out of 423 in the category of Condensed Matter Physics.

== Abstracting and indexing ==
This journal is abstracted and indexed by:

- American Ceramic Society
- Cambridge Scientific Abstracts
- Chemical Abstracts Service
- Current Contents
- Engineering Index
- FIZ Karlsruhe
- Metals Abstracts
- Physics Abstracts
- Science Citation Index
- Scopus
- World Surface Coatings Abstracts
