= Macromolecular Materials and Engineering =

- Discipline: Polymer science
- Language: English
- Edited by: David Huesmann

Publication details
- Former name(s): Angewandte Makromolekulare; Chemie
- History: 2000-present
- Publisher: Wiley-VCH
- Frequency: Monthly
- Open access: Hybrid
- Impact factor: 4.367 (2020)

Standard abbreviations
- ISO 4: Macromol. Mater. Eng.

Indexing
- CODEN: MMENFA
- ISSN: 1438-7492 (print); 1439-2054 (web)

Links
- Journal homepage; Online access; Online archive

Macromolecular Materials and Engineering is a monthly peer-reviewed scientific journal covering polymer science. It publishes Reviews, Feature Articles, Communications, and Full Papers on design, modification, characterization, and processing of advanced polymeric materials. Published topics include materials research on engineering polymers, tailor-made functional polymer systems, and new polymer additives. The editor-in-chief is David Huesmann.

According to the Journal Citation Reports, the journal has a 2020 impact factor of 4.367.
