= Macromolecular Bioscience =

- Discipline: Polymer science
- Language: English
- Edited by: Anne Pfisterer

Publication details
- History: 2001-present
- Publisher: Wiley-VCH (Germany)
- Frequency: monthly
- Impact factor: 4.4 (2023)

Standard abbreviations
- ISO 4: Macromol. Biosci.

Indexing
- CODEN: MBAIBU
- ISSN: 1616-5187 (print); 1616-5195 (web)

Links
- Journal homepage; Online archive

Macromolecular Bioscience is a monthly peer-reviewed scientific journal covering polymer science. It publishes Reviews, Feature Articles, Communications, and Full Papers at the intersection of polymer and materials sciences with life science and medicine. The editorial office is in Weinheim, Germany. The editor-in-chief is Anne Pfisterer. According to the Journal Citation Reports, the journal has a 2020 impact factor of 4.979.

== Abstracting and indexing ==
- BIOSIS Previews
- Biochemistry & Biophysics Citation Index
- Science Citation Index
- Current Contents/Physical, Chemical & Earth Sciences
- Chemical Abstracts Service
- Advanced Polymers Abstracts
- BIOBASE
- Biotechnology & Bioengineering Abstracts
- Compendex
- Embase
- Scopus
- Ceramic Abstracts
- Civil Engineering Abstracts
- Earthquake Engineering Abstracts
- Engineered Materials Abstracts
- International Aerospace Abstracts & Database
- MEDLINE/PubMed
- Polymer Library
