= Classical and Quantum Gravity =

Peer-reviewed journal

- Discipline: Gravitational physics
- Language: English
- Edited by: Susan Scott

Publication details
- History: 1984–present
- Publisher: IOP Publishing (UK)
- Frequency: 24 per year
- Open access: Hybrid
- Impact factor: 3.9 (2025)

Standard abbreviations
- ISO 4: Class. Quantum Gravity
- MathSciNet: Classical Quantum Gravity

Indexing
- CODEN: CQGRDG
- ISSN: 0264-9381 (print); 1361-6382 (web)

Links
- Journal homepage

Classical and Quantum Gravity is a peer-reviewed journal that covers all aspects of gravitational physics and the theory of spacetime.

The editor-in-chief is Susan Scott at the Australian National University. The journal's 2025 impact factor is 3.9 according to Journal Citation Reports. As of October 2015, the journal publishes letters in addition to regular articles.

== Scope ==
The journal's scope includes:

- Classical general relativity
- Applications of relativity
- Experimental gravitation
- Cosmology and the early universe
- Quantum gravity
- Supergravity, superstrings and supersymmetry
- Mathematical physics relevant to gravitation

Classical and Quantum Gravity also supports the field of gravitational physics through sponsorship of the British Gravity Meeting.

== CQG+ ==
Until the end of 2023, the journal used to have a companion blog website, called "CQG+", that highlighted high-quality papers published in the journal in order to raise the visibility of those papers.

The former "CQG+" content is now hosted at a WordPress site.

The site featured reviews of films related to gravity, such as Interstellar (2014) and The Theory of Everything (2014).

== Abstracting and indexing ==
This journal is indexed in the following databases:

- Science Citation Index Expanded
- Current Contents / Physical, Chemical and Earth Sciences
- Scopus
- Inspec
- Chemical Abstracts Service
- INIS (International Nuclear Information System)
- Mathematical Reviews
- MathSciNet
- NASA Astrophysics Data System
- PASCAL Database
- INSPIRE-HEP
- VINITI – Referativnyi Zhurnal
- Zentralblatt MATH
