= Journal of Physics B =

Journal of Physics B: Atomic, Molecular and Optical Physics
- Discipline: Physics
- Language: English
- Edited by: Marc Vrakking

Publication details
- History: 1968–1987: Journal of Physics B: Atomic and Molecular Physics; 1988–present: Journal of Physics B: Atomic, Molecular and Optical Physics; In 2006, this journal merged with Journal of Optics B (1999–2005).
- Publisher: IOP Publishing
- Frequency: Biweekly
- Open access: Hybrid
- License: CC BY 3.0 (open access part)
- Impact factor: 1.7 (2025)

Standard abbreviations
- ISO 4: J. Phys. B

Indexing
- CODEN: JPAPEH
- ISSN: 0953-4075 (print); 1361-6455 (web)
- LCCN: 88659276
- OCLC no.: 17570920

Links
- Journal homepage

The Journal of Physics B: Atomic, Molecular and Optical Physics is a biweekly peer-reviewed scientific journal published by IOP Publishing. It was established in 1968 from the division of the earlier title, Proceedings of the Physical Society. In 2006, the Journal of Optics B: Quantum and Semiclassical Optics was merged with the Journal of Physics B. The editor-in-chief is Marc Vrakking (Max Born Institute for Nonlinear Optics and Short Pulse Spectroscopy).

== Scope ==
The journal covers research on atomic, molecular, and optical physics. Topics include atomic and molecular structure, spectra and collisions, ultracold matter, quantum optics and non linear optics, quantum information, laser physics, intense laser fields, ultrafast and x-ray physics and atomic and molecular physics in plasmas.

The journal publishes research papers, fast track communications, topical reviews, tutorials, and invited articles. It occasionally publishes special issues on developing research fields.

== Abstracting and indexing ==
The journal is abstracted and indexed in:

- Astrophysics Data System
- Chemical Abstracts
- Engineering Index/Ei Compendex
- Current Contents/Physical, Chemical and Earth Sciences
- International Nuclear Information System
- Inspec
- MathSciNet
- PASCAL
- Science Citation Index
- Scopus
- Referativny Zhurnal

== See also ==
- Journal of Physics
