= Journal of Physics A =

Journal of Physics A: Mathematical and Theoretical
- Discipline: Physics
- Language: English
- Edited by: Joseph A Minahan

Publication details
- History: 1968–1972: Journal of Physics A: General Physics; 1973–1974: Journal of Physics A: Mathematical, Nuclear and General; 1975–2006: Journal of Physics A: Mathematical and General; 2007–present: Journal of Physics A: Mathematical and Theoretical
- Publisher: IOP Publishing
- Frequency: 50/year
- Open access: Hybrid
- License: CC BY 3.0 (open access part)
- Impact factor: 1.9 (2025)

Standard abbreviations
- ISO 4: J. Phys. A

Indexing
- CODEN: JPAMB5
- ISSN: 1751-8113 (print); 1751-8121 (web)
- LCCN: 2007252300
- OCLC no.: 78212172

Links
- Journal homepage

The Journal of Physics A: Mathematical and Theoretical is a peer-reviewed scientific journal published by IOP Publishing, the publishing branch of the Institute of Physics. It is part of the Journal of Physics series and covers theoretical physics focusing on sophisticated mathematical and computational techniques.

The journal is divided into six sections covering: statistical physics; chaotic and complex systems; mathematical physics; quantum mechanics and quantum information theory; classical and quantum field theory; fluid and plasma theory.

The editor in chief is Joseph A Minahan (Uppsala Universitet, Sweden). According to the Journal Citation Reports, the journal has a 2025 impact factor of 1.9.

== History ==
Journal of Physics A was established in 1968 as one of the subdivisions of the earlier title, Proceedings of the Physical Society, established in 1874, the flagship journal of the Physical Society of London. The Physical Society later became the Institute of Physics, the current publisher of the journal. Its papers began being made available electronically in 1991; by 2002, its entire back archive had been digitised, as the first step in a larger project to digitise all of the Institute's publishing archives.

== Indexing ==
The journal is indexed in:

- Scopus
- Inspec
- Chemical Abstracts
- GeoRef
- INIS Atomindex
- Astrophysics Data System
- PASCAL
- Referativny Zhurnal
- Zentralblatt MATH
- Science Citation Index and SciSearch
- Current Contents/Physical, Chemical and Earth Sciences

== See also ==
- Journal of Physics: Condensed Matter
