= Journal of Electronic Materials =

- Discipline: Materials science
- Language: English
- Edited by: Wojciech M. Jadwisienczak

Publication details
- History: 1972-present
- Publisher: Springer Science+Business Media
- Frequency: Monthly
- Impact factor: 2.8 (2025)

Standard abbreviations
- ISO 4: J. Electron. Mater.

Indexing
- ISSN: 0361-5235

Links
- Journal homepage; Online access

The Journal of Electronic Materials is a monthly peer-reviewed scientific journal that publishes studies, research, developments, and applications of materials that produce electronics. The editor-in-chief is Wojciech M. Jadwisienczak, Ohio University, Athens, United States. The IEEE/TMS Journal of Electronic Materials (JEM) is jointly sponsored by the IEEE Electron Devices Society and The Minerals, Metals and Materials Society. It is published by Springer on behalf of IEEE and TMS.

The journal also investigates the latest uses for semiconductors, magnetic alloys, dielectrics, nanoscale materials, and photonic materials. It also publishes methodologies for investigating the chemical properties, physical properties, and the electronic, and optical properties of these materials. Also, the specific materials science involves transistors, nanotechnology, electronic packaging, detectors, emitters, metallization, superconductivity, and energy applications.

Publishing formats include review papers and selected conference papers. Specialists and non-specialists, interested in this journal's topical coverage, are the target audience .

== Abstracting and indexing services ==
According to the Journal Citation Reports, the Journal of Electronic Materials has a 2025 impact factor of 2.8.

The following databases provide indexing and abstracting services:

- Academic OneFile
- Astrophysics Data System
- Chemical Abstracts Service
- ChemWeb
- Chimica
- Compendex
- Current Abstracts
- Current Contents/Electronics & Telecommunications
- Current Contents/Physical, Chemical and Earth Sciences
- Gale
- INIS Atomindex
- Inspec
- Journal Citation Reports
- Materials Science Citation Index
- ProQuest
- Science Citation Index
- Scopus
- Summon by Serial Solutions
- TOC Premier
- VINITI Database RAS
