= Measurement Science and Technology =

- Discipline: Engineering
- Language: English
- Edited by: Andrew Yacoot

Publication details
- Former names: Journal of Scientific Instruments, Journal of Physics E: Scientific Instruments, Journal of Scientific Instruments
- History: 1923–present
- Publisher: IOP Publishing (United Kingdom)
- Frequency: Monthly
- Open access: Hybrid
- Impact factor: 2.7 (2023)

Standard abbreviations
- ISO 4: Meas. Sci. Technol.

Indexing
- CODEN: MSTCEP
- ISSN: 0957-0233 (print); 1361-6501 (web)
- LCCN: 90640774
- OCLC no.: 20943814

Links
- Journal homepage; Journal of Physics E: Scientific Instruments archive; Journal of Scientific Instruments archive

Measurement Science and Technology is a monthly peer-reviewed scientific journal, published by IOP Publishing, covering the areas of measurement, instrumentation, and sensor technology in science. The editor-in-chief is Andrew Yacoot (National Physical Laboratory).

== History ==
The journal was established in 1923 as the Journal of Scientific Instruments. The first issue was introduced by J. J. Thomson, then president of the Institute of Physics, who stated that no publication existed at that time in the English language specially devoted to scientific instruments. The idea for the journal was promoted by Richard Glazebrook, the first president, then director, of the National Physical Laboratory, where the journal was initially edited. The need for interdisciplinarity was recognised even then, with the desire to co-opt biologists, engineers, chemists, and instrument makers, "as well as physicists", on the scientific advisory committee. The Institute of Physics merged with the Physical Society of London in 1960. By this time the Proceedings of the Physical Society had grown in size and the quality of the applied journals, British Journal of Applied Physics and Journal of Scientific Instruments, had been improved. In 1968 these journals were merged to form part of the Journal of Physics series of journals, A to E, the fifth journal in the series being Journal of Physics E: Scientific Instruments. In 1990 the journal was renamed as Measurement Science and Technology to reflect the shift away from many scientists making their own instruments. Since 2003 the journal archive containing all articles published since 1874 are available online.

== Abstracting and indexing ==
The journal is abstracted and indexed in:

- Science Citation Index
- Current Contents/Physical, Chemical and Earth Sciences
- Current Contents/Engineering, Computing and Technology
- Scopus
- Inspec
- Aerospace & High Technology Database
- Applied Science and Technology Abstracts
- Chemical Abstracts Service
- Compendex
- Environmental Sciences & Pollution Management
- FLUIDEX
- GeoRef
- NASA Astrophysics Data System
- MEDLINE/PubMed
- VINITI
- Referativnyi Zhurnal

According to the website, the journal has a 2023 impact factor of 2.7.
