= Reports on Progress in Physics =

- Discipline: Physics
- Language: English
- Edited by: Subir Sachdev

Publication details
- History: 1934–present
- Publisher: IOP Publishing
- Frequency: Monthly
- Impact factor: 15.4 (2025)

Standard abbreviations
- ISO 4: Rep. Prog. Phys.
- MathSciNet: Rep. Progr. Phys.

Indexing
- CODEN: RPPHAG
- ISSN: 0034-4885 (print); 1361-6633 (web)
- LCCN: 35016768
- OCLC no.: 1607643

Links
- Journal homepage

Reports on Progress in Physics (ROPP) is a peer-reviewed highly selective multidisciplinary journal published by IOP Publishing. Its mission to publish ground-breaking original research and authoritative reviews of the highest quality and significance, across all areas of physics and related areas. As of 2026, the editorial board is led by editor-in-chief Subir Sachdev.

First appearing in 1934, ROPP has traditionally been known as a reviews journal, publishing articles that present the mature development of an area of physics that has resulted in significant advances of wide interest to physics and related disciplines. However, in 2024, the journal also started publishing original research articles of broader multidisciplinary interest with the expectation for long-term scientific impact and influence on the current state and/or future direction of a field.

== Abstracting and indexing ==
Reports on Progress in Physics is abstracted and indexed in the following databases:

- Astrophysics Data System
- Chemical Abstracts Service
- Current Contents/Physical, Chemical and Earth Sciences
- GeoRef
- INIS Atomindex
- Inspec
- MathSciNet
- Referativnyi Zhurnal
- Science Citation Index
- Scopus
- VINITI
