= IOP Publishing =

British academic publishing company

- Parent company: Institute of Physics
- Founded: 1874
- Country of origin: United Kingdom
- Headquarters location: Bristol, England
- Key people: Tom Grinyer (Group CEO); Antonia Seymour (Chief Executive IOP Publishing)
- Publication types: Academic journals, magazines
- Nonfiction topics: Science
- Official website: ioppublishing.org

IOP Publishing (previously Institute of Physics Publishing) is the publishing branch of the Institute of Physics. It provides publications through which peer-reviewed scientific research is distributed worldwide. Its publishing portfolio includes over 100 open access and hybrid journals, magazines, conference proceedings and books. The Institute of Physics is a scientific charity devoted to increasing the practice, understanding and application of physics. Any financial surplus earned by IOP Publishing goes to support physics through the various activities of the Institute.

The main IOP Publishing headquarters is located in Bristol, England. It also has regional offices in Philadelphia and Beijing. It employs over 500 staff.

IOP Publishing was the first physics publisher to publish a journal on the internet. In 1994, the journal Classical and Quantum Gravity was published as a TeX file. In January 1996, the organization launched the full electronic journals programme on the World Wide Web, ahead of other physics publishers.

Physics World, the monthly magazine of the Institute of Physics, was first published in October 1988. The title, published by IOP Publishing won in the App/Digital Edition category for Association/Non-Profit (B-to-B) brands at the Eddie Digital Awards. It also picked up an honourable mention for best Design Cover at the Association/Non-Profit (B-to-B) category in the Ozzie Awards.

IOP Publishing is a member of Purpose-Led Publishing, a coalition formed in partnership with AIP Publishing and the American Physical Society. The initiative is dedicated to prioritising purpose over profit in scholarly publishing, and aims to establish industry-wide standards that promote ethical, high-quality academic communication.

== Journals ==
IOPscience is IOP Publishing's the online service platform for journal content. Journals include:

- 2D Materials
- Advances in Natural Sciences: Nanoscience and Nanotechnology
- AI for Science
- Applied Physics Express
- The Astronomical Journal
- The Astrophysical Journal
- The Astrophysical Journal Letters
- The Astrophysical Journal Supplement Series
- Biofabrication
- Bioinspiration & Biomimetics
- Biomedical Materials
- Biomedical Physics & Engineering Express
- Chinese Physics B
- Chinese Physics C
- Chinese Physics Letters
- Classical and Quantum Gravity
- Communications in Theoretical Physics
- Computational Science & Discovery
- Convergent Science Physical Oncology
- ECS Advances
- ECS Journal of Solid State Science and Technology
- ECS Meeting Abstracts
- ECS Sensors Plus
- The Electrochemical Society Interface
- Electronic Structure
- Engineering Research Express
- Environmental Research Communications
- Environmental Research Letters
- Environmental Research: Climate
- Environmental Research: Ecology
- Environmental Research: Energy
- Environmental Research: Food Systems
- Environmental Research: Health
- Environmental Research: Infrastructure and Sustainability
- Environmental Research: Water
- EPL
- European Journal of Physics
- Flexible and Printed Electronics
- Fluid Dynamics Research
- Functional Composites and Structures
- IOP Conference Series: Earth and Environmental Science
- IOP Conference Series: Materials Science and Engineering
- International Journal of Extreme Manufacturing
- Inverse Problems
- Izvestiya: Mathematics
- Japanese Journal of Applied Physics
- Journal of Breath Research
- Journal of Physics: Complexity
- Journal of Cosmology and Astroparticle Physics
- Journal of Geophysics and Engineering
- Journal of Instrumentation
- Journal of Micromechanics and Microengineering
- Journal of Neural Engineering
- Journal of Optics
- Journal of Physics A: Mathematical and Theoretical
- Journal of Physics B: Atomic, Molecular and Optical Physics
- Journal of Physics Communications
- Journal of Physics: Condensed Matter
- Journal of Physics: Conference Series
- Journal of Physics D: Applied Physics
- Journal of Physics: Energy
- Journal of Physics G: Nuclear and Particle Physics
- Journal of Physics: Materials
- Journal of Physics: Photonics
- Journal of Radiological Protection
- Journal of Reliability Science and Engineering
- Journal of The Electrochemical Society
- Journal of Semiconductors
- Journal of Statistical Mechanics: Theory and Experiment
- Laser Physics
- Laser Physics Letters
- Machine Learning: Earth
- Machine Learning: Engineering
- Machine Learning: Health
- Machine Learning: Science and Technology
- Materials for Quantum Technology
- Materials Futures
- Materials Research Express
- Measurement Science and Technology
- Medical Engineering & Physics
- Medical Sensors & Imaging
- Methods and Applications in Fluorescence
- Metrologia
- Modelling and Simulation in Materials Science and Engineering
- Multifunctional Materials
- Nano Express
- Nano Futures
- Nanotechnology
- Neuromorphic Computing and Engineering
- New Journal of Physics
- Nonlinearity
- Nuclear Fusion
- Physica Scripta
- Physical Biology
- Physics Education
- Physics in Medicine and Biology
- Physics-Uspekhi
- Physiological Measurement
- The Planetary Science Journal
- Plasma Physics and Controlled Fusion
- Plasma Research Express
- Plasma Science and Technology
- Plasma Sources Science and Technology
- Progress in Biomedical Engineering
- Progress in Energy
- Publications of the Astronomical Society of the Pacific
- Quantum Electronics
- Quantum Science and Technology
- Reports on Progress in Physics
- Research in Astronomy and Astrophysics
- Research Notes of the AAS
- Russian Chemical Reviews
- Russian Mathematical Surveys
- Sbornik: Mathematics
- Semiconductor Science and Technology
- Smart Materials and Structures
- Superconductor Science and Technology
- Surface Topography: Metrology and Properties
- Sustainability Science and Technology
- Translational Materials Research

Some of these journals are published on behalf of other societies; for example, the Astrophysical Journal group of titles are published in partnership with the American Astronomical Society.

== Books ==
IOP Publishing sold its books publishing division (with the imprint Adam Hilger) to Taylor & Francis in 2005. As a consequence of recent significant changes in the publishing landscape and demand for ebooks, IOP Publishing launched an ebook programme in 2012. IOP Publishing partnered with Morgan & Claypool on a book programme which is focussed on researchers who are in the early stages of their research careers, or the ones who would like to approach a research field more broadly and across different disciplines. In 2014 IOP Publishing and the American Astronomical Society announced an electronic book publishing partnership as part of the AAS's mission to enhance and share humanity’s scientific understanding of the universe.
