= Microsystem Technologies =

- Discipline: Engineering
- Language: English
- Edited by: B. Michel, B. Bhushan

Publication details
- History: 1994-present
- Publisher: Springer Science+Business Media
- Frequency: Monthly
- Impact factor: 1.513 (2018)

Standard abbreviations
- ISO 4: Microsyst. Technol.

Indexing
- CODEN: MCTCEF
- ISSN: 0946-7076 (print); 1432-1858 (web)
- LCCN: 97660016
- OCLC no.: 488207364

Links
- Journal homepage

Microsystem Technologies is a peer-reviewed scientific journal published by Springer Science+Business Media. It covers research on electromechanical, materials, design, and manufacturing aspects of microsystems and their components. The editors-in-chief of the journal are B. Michel (Fraunhofer IZM, Berlin, Germany) and B. Bhushan (Ohio State University).

== Abstracting and indexing ==
The journal is abstracted and indexed in:

- Scopus
- Academic Search
- Chemical Abstracts Service
- Compendex
- Current Contents/Engineering
- Inspec
- EI-Compendex
- INIS Atomindex
- PASCAL
- Materials Science Citation Index
- VINITI
- Science Citation Index

According to the Journal Citation Reports, the journal has a 2016 impact factor of 1.195.
