= Biomedical Materials (journal) =

- Discipline: Regenerative medicine
- Language: English
- Edited by: Jianwu Dai

Publication details
- History: 2006-present
- Publisher: IOP Publishing (United Kingdom)
- Frequency: Bimonthly
- Open access: Hybrid
- Impact factor: 3.9 (2023)

Standard abbreviations
- ISO 4: Biomed. Mater.

Indexing
- CODEN: BMBUCS
- ISSN: 1748-6041 (print); 1748-605X (web)
- LCCN: 2007261035
- OCLC no.: 82364825

Links
- Journal homepage

Biomedical Materials is a peer-reviewed medical journal that covers research on tissue engineering and regenerative medicine. The editors-in-chief are Myron Spector (Harvard Medical School and VA Boston Healthcare System) and Joyce Wong (Boston University).

== Abstracting and indexing ==
The journal is abstracted and indexed in:

- Aerospace & High Technology Database
- Chemical Abstracts Service
- Compendex
- Current Awareness in Biological Sciences
- Embase
- EMBiology
- International Nuclear Information System
- Inspec
- Materials Science Citation Index
- NASA Astrophysics Data System
- PubMed/MEDLINE
- Science Citation Index
- Scopus
- VINITI Abstracts Journal

According to the Journal Citation Reports, the journal has a 2023 impact factor of 3.9.
