= Modelling and Simulation in Materials Science and Engineering =

- Discipline: Materials science, engineering
- Language: English
- Edited by: Javier Llorca

Publication details
- History: 1992-present
- Publisher: IOP Publishing (United Kingdom)
- Frequency: 8/year
- Impact factor: 1.9 (2023)

Standard abbreviations
- ISO 4: Model. Simul. Mater. Sci. Eng.

Indexing
- ISSN: 0965-0393 (print); 1361-651X (web)
- LCCN: 93650003
- OCLC no.: 34607473

Links
- Journal homepage

Modelling and Simulation in Materials Science and Engineering is a peer-reviewed scientific journal published by the IOP Publishing eight times per year.

The journal covers computational materials science including properties, structure, and behavior of all classes of materials at scales from the atomic to the macroscopic. This includes electronic structure/properties of materials determined by ab initio and/or semi-empirical methods, atomic level properties of materials, microstructural level phenomena, continuum-level modelling pertaining to material behaviour, and modelling behaviour in service. Mechanical, microstructural, electronic, chemical, biological, and optical properties of materials are also of interest.

The editors-in-chief is Javier Llorca (Polytechnic University of Madrid & IMDEA Materials Institute, Spain).

== Abstracting and indexing ==
The journal is abstracted and indexed by:

- Aerospace Database
- Chemical Abstracts Service
- Compendex
- Inspec
- Astrophysics Data System
- Scopus
- VINITI Database RAS
- Current Contents/Engineering, Computing and Technology
- Current Contents/Physical, Chemical & Earth Sciences
- Materials Science Citation Index
- Science Citation Index

== See also ==
- Journal of Physics: Condensed Matter
- List of computational materials science software
