= Bioinspiration & Biomimetics =

- Discipline: Biological and Physical sciences
- Language: English
- Edited by: Robert J Full

Publication details
- History: 2006–present
- Publisher: IOP Publishing (UK)
- Frequency: bimonthly
- Open access: Hybrid
- Impact factor: 3.1 (2023)

Standard abbreviations
- ISO 4: Bioinspir. Biomim.

Indexing
- CODEN: BBIICI
- ISSN: 1748-3182 (print); 1748-3190 (web)

Links
- Journal homepage

Bioinspiration & Biomimetics is a peer-reviewed journal that publishes research involving the study and distillation of principles and functions found in biological systems that have been developed through evolution. It was quarterly during 2006~2014 and became bimonthly in 2015.

The editor-in-chief is Robert J Full at the University of California, Berkeley, USA.

== Abstracting and indexing ==
This journal is indexed by the following databases:

- Science Citation Index
- Materials Science Citation Index
- Journal Citation Reports/Science Edition
- Medline/PubMed
- Scopus
- Inspec
- Chemical Abstracts Service
- Current Awareness in Biological Sciences
- EMBiology
- NASA Astrophysics Data System
- VINITI Abstracts Journal (Referativnyi Zhurnal)
