= Journal of Physics D =

Journal of Physics D: Applied Physics
- Discipline: Applied physics
- Language: English
- Edited by: Huiyun Liu

Publication details
- Former name: British Journal of Applied Physics (1950–1967)
- History: 1968–present
- Publisher: IOP Publishing (United Kingdom)
- Frequency: 50/year
- Open access: Hybrid
- Impact factor: 3.2 (2025)

Standard abbreviations
- ISO 4: J. Phys. D: Appl. Phys.

Indexing
- CODEN: JPDBAK
- ISSN: 0022-3727 (print); 1361-6463 (web)
- OCLC no.: 50353526

Links
- Journal homepage

Journal of Physics D: Applied Physics is a peer-reviewed scientific journal published by IOP Publishing. It was established in 1968 from the division of the earlier title, Proceedings of the Physical Society. It has a broad coverage, including five main focus areas: magnetism; photonics and semiconductors; plasmas and plasma-surface interactions; applied surfaces and interfaces; structure and properties of matter and renewable energy/sustainability. The editor-in-chief is Huiyun Liu (University College London).

== Abstracting and indexing ==
The journal is abstracted and indexed in:

- Aerospace & High Technology Database
- Applied Science and Technology Abstracts
- Applied Science and Technology Index
- Astrophysics Data System
- Chemical Abstracts Service
- Compendex
- Current Contents/Physical, Chemical and Earth Sciences
- Inspec
- International Nuclear Information System
- METADEX
- PASCAL
- Polymer Library
- Science Citation Index Expanded
- Scopus
- Referativny Zhurnal

According to the Journal Citation Reports, the journal has a 2025 impact factor of 3.2.
