= Abhijit Sen (physicist) =

Indian Plasma Physicist

Abhijit Sen, FNASc, FNA, FIAS
- Born: 1943 (age 82–83)
- Education: Gujarat University University of Tennessee
- Awards: Young Scientist award INSA National Merit Scholarship Government of India
- Scientific career
- Fields: Plasma Physics
- Workplaces: University of Tennessee Oak Ridge National Laboratory Post Doctoral research MIT Physical Research Laboratory Institute for Plasma Research Space Applications Centre ITER
- Website: https://www.ipr.res.in/documents/prof.%20Abhijit%20Sen

Abhijit Sen is Emeritus Scientist and INSA fellow, Sr. Professor, of the Institute for Plasma Research, Chandrasekhar Chair. Sen has published more than 300 research paper in reputed journals.

== Education ==
Sen received a National Merit Scholarship from the Government of India during his education (1962–66). Sen completed his Bachelor of Science at Gujarat University in Physics in 1963. He later completed both a Master of Science and Doctor of Philosophy in Physics at the University of Tennessee in 1971. Following his doctoral studies, Sen became a Postdoctoral researcher at Oak Ridge National Laboratory.

== Award and honours ==
Sen's awards include:

- Young Scientist award from Indian National Science Academy
- Fellow, Gujarat Science Society
- Fellow of Indian Academy of Sciences
- Fellow of National Academy of Sciences, India
- Fellow of Indian National Science Academy
- Fellow of American Physical Society
- Fellow of Institute of Physics
- Senior Associate of International Centre for Theoretical Physics

== Science leadership ==
Sen is member of many organisations

- Chairman of International Union of Pure and Applied Physics
- Chairman of board of governors Indian Institute of Geomagnetism
- Member Editorial board of Plasma Sources Science and Technology, Plasma Physics and Controlled Fusion, Nuclear Fusion (journal), Pramana (journal), Indian Journal of Physics
- Member Academic Council Visva-Bharati University Indian Institute of Geomagnetism
- Member Science and technology advisory committee ITER
