= Environmental Research Letters =

- Discipline: Environmental science
- Language: English
- Edited by: Radhika Khosla

Publication details
- History: 2006–present
- Publisher: IOP Publishing
- Frequency: Monthly
- Open access: Yes
- Impact factor: 5.8 (2023)

Standard abbreviations
- ISO 4: Environ. Res. Lett.

Indexing
- CODEN: ERLNAL
- ISSN: 1748-9326 (print); 1748-9326 (web)

Links
- Journal homepage

Environmental Research Letters is a peer-reviewed, open-access, scientific journal covering research on all aspects of environmental science. It is published by IOP Publishing. The editor-in-chief is Radhika Khosla (University of Oxford, UK).

== Abstracting and indexing ==
The journal is abstracted and indexed in:

- Chemical Abstracts
- Inspec
- Scopus
- Astrophysics Data System
- CAB Abstracts
- GEOBASE
- GeoRef
- International Nuclear Information System
