= Semiconductor Science and Technology =

- Discipline: Semiconductors
- Language: English
- Edited by: Koji Ishibashi

Publication details
- History: 1986-present
- Publisher: IOP Publishing
- Frequency: Monthly
- Impact factor: 2.1 (2025)

Standard abbreviations
- ISO 4: Semicond. Sci. Technol.

Indexing
- ISSN: 0268-1242 (print); 1361-6641 (web)

Links
- Journal homepage

Semiconductor Science and Technology is a peer-reviewed scientific journal covering all applied or explicitly applicable experimental and theoretical studies of the properties of semiconductors and their interfaces, devices, and packaging. The journal publishes different article types including research papers, rapid communications, and topical reviews. The editor-in-chief is Koji Ishibashi (Advanced Device Laboratory, RIKEN, Japan). The previous editors-in-chief were Kornelius Nielsch (University of Hamburg) and Laurens Molenkamp (University of Würzburg).

The journal is indexed in Inspec, Chemical Abstracts, Compendex, Applied Science and Technology Abstracts, Applied Science and Technology Index, PASCAL, VINITI Database RAS, and Science Citation Index Expanded.
