= Nanotechnology (journal) =

- Discipline: Nanotechnology
- Language: English
- Edited by: Ray LaPierre

Publication details
- History: 1990–present
- Publisher: IOP Publishing (United Kingdom)
- Frequency: Weekly
- Impact factor: 2.9 (2025)

Standard abbreviations
- ISO 4: Nanotechnology

Indexing
- CODEN: NNOTER
- ISSN: 0957-4484 (print); 1361-6528 (web)

Links
- Journal homepage

Nanotechnology is a peer-reviewed scientific journal published by IOP Publishing. It covers research in all areas of nanotechnology. The editor-in-chief is Ray LaPierre (McMaster University, Canada).

== Abstracting, indexing, and impact factor ==
According to the Journal Citation Reports, the journal has a 2025 impact factor of 2.9.

It is indexed in the following bibliographic databases:

- Chemical Abstracts
- Compendex
- Inspec
- Web of Science
- PubMed
- Scopus
- Astrophysics Data System
- Aerospace & High Technology
- EMBASE
- Environmental Science and Pollution Management
- International Nuclear Information System
