= Journal of Optics =

Journal of Optics may refer to

- Journal of Optics (IOP Publishing journal), a journal published by IOP Publishing on behalf of the European Optical Society:
  - Journal of Optics A: Pure and Applied Optics
  - Journal of Optics B: Quantum and Semiclassical Optics
- Journal of Optics (India), a journal published by Springer on behalf of the Optical Society of India

== See also ==
- Journal of Modern Optics
- Journal of the Optical Society of America A
- Journal of the Optical Society of America B
