= Metrologia =

Journal dealing with the scientific aspects of metrology

- Discipline: Physics
- Language: English
- Edited by: Sten Bergstrand, Janet Miles

Publication details
- History: 1965–present
- Publisher: IOP Publishing on behalf of the International Bureau of Weights and Measures
- Frequency: Bimonthly
- Open access: Hybrid
- Impact factor: 2.1 (2023)

Standard abbreviations
- ISO 4: Metrologia

Indexing
- CODEN: MTRGAU
- ISSN: 0026-1394 (print); 1681-7575 (web)
- LCCN: 65009907
- OCLC no.: 48198209

Links
- Journal homepage

Metrologia is a bimonthly journal dealing with the scientific aspects of metrology. It has been running since 1965 and has been published by the International Bureau of Weights and Measures since 1991. Since 2003 the journal has been published by IOP Publishing on behalf of the bureau. The journal covers the fundamentals of measurements, in particular those dealing with the seven base units of the International System of Units (metre, kilogram, second, ampere, kelvin, candela, mole) or proposals to replace them.

The editors-in-chief are Sten Bergstrand (RISE Research Institutes of Sweden) and Janet Miles (International Bureau of Weights and Measures).

== Abstracting and indexing ==
This journal is indexed by the following databases:

- Science Citation Index Expanded
- Scopus
- Inspec
- Chemical Abstracts Service
- Compendex
- GeoRef
- MathSciNet
- Astrophysics Data System
- VINITI Abstracts Journal
