= Computational Science & Discovery =

- Discipline: Computational science
- Language: English
- Edited by: Nathan A Baker

Publication details
- History: 2008-2015
- Publisher: IOP Publishing (United Kingdom)
- Open access: Yes

Standard abbreviations
- ISO 4: Comput. Sci. Discov.

Indexing
- CODEN: CSD0A3
- ISSN: 1749-4680 (print); 1749-4699 (web)
- OCLC no.: 285313364

Links
- Journal homepage

Computational Science & Discovery was a peer-reviewed scientific journal covering computational science in physics, chemistry, biology, and applied science. The editor-in-chief was Nathan A Baker (Pacific Northwest National Laboratory), who succeeded Anthony Mezzacappa (Oak Ridge National Laboratory) in 2011. The journal was established in 2008 and ceased publication in 2015, but all articles will remain available online.

== Abstracting and indexing ==
This journal was indexed by the following services:

- Scopus
- Inspec
- Chemical Abstracts Service
- FLUIDEX
- International Nuclear Information System/Atomindex
- NASA Astrophysics Data System
- MathSciNet
- PASCAL
