= New Journal of Physics =

- Discipline: Physics
- Language: English
- Edited by: Andreas Buchleitner

Publication details
- History: 1998–present
- Publisher: IOP Publishing and Deutsche Physikalische Gesellschaft
- Open access: Yes
- License: CC BY 3.0 (after November 2012), CC BY-NC-SA 3.0 (before November 2012)
- Impact factor: 2.8 (2025)

Standard abbreviations
- ISO 4: New J. Phys.

Indexing
- CODEN: NJOPFM
- ISSN: 1367-2630
- LCCN: 1193529983

Links
- Journal homepage

New Journal of Physics is an online-only, open-access, peer-reviewed scientific journal covering research in all aspects of physics, as well as interdisciplinary topics where physics forms the central theme. The journal was established in 1998 and is a joint publication of the Institute of Physics and the Deutsche Physikalische Gesellschaft. It is published by IOP Publishing. The editor-in-chief is Andreas Buchleitner (Albert Ludwigs University). New Journal of Physics is part of the SCOAP^{3} initiative.

In April 2023, on occasion of the World Quantum Day, IOP Publishing has launched a special collection of its most important articles published in the field of quantum research. The articles will be extracted from Materials for Quantum Technology, Quantum Science and Technology, New Journal of Physics and Reports on Progress in Physics.

== Abstracting and indexing ==
The journal is abstracted and indexed in:

- Astrophysics Data System
- Chemical Abstracts Service
- Current Contents/Physical, Chemical & Earth Sciences
- Directory of Open Access Journals
- EBSCO databases
- Ei Compendex
- INIS Atomindex
- Inspec
- Science Citation Index Expanded
- Scopus
- zbMATH Open

According to the Journal Citation Reports, the journal has a 2025 impact factor of 2.8.
