= Richard Dendy =

British theoretical physicist

- Education: University of Oxford
- Scientific career
- Fields: Plasma physics
- Workplaces: University of Warwick
- Doctoral advisor: Dirk ter Haar

Richard O. Dendy is a British theoretical physicist. He is a professor of physics at the University of Warwick.

Dendy's research is in theoretical plasma physics. He has worked on ion cyclotron emission from energetic ions in fusion plasmas, where he applied the magnetoacoustic cyclotron instability to it, and on sandpile models of plasma transport. He wrote the textbook Plasma Dynamics and edited Plasma Physics: An Introductory Course.

From 2005 to 2023, Dendy was editor-in-chief of Plasma Physics and Controlled Fusion. In 2018, IOP Publishing established an award named after him, the PPCF Dendy Europe-Asia Pacific Award. From 2016 to 2022, he chaired the Plasma Physics Division of the European Physical Society.

== Education and career ==
Dendy graduated in physics from the University of Oxford and completed Part III of the Mathematical Tripos at the University of Cambridge. He returned to Oxford for a doctorate in theoretical plasma physics, which was supervised by Dirk ter Haar. He completed his DPhil in 1983.

Starting in 1995 Dendy led the theoretical physics group in the nuclear fusion research programme run by Euratom and the United Kingdom Atomic Energy Authority based at Culham in Oxfordshire. He retired from there in 2022. He was appointed an honorary professor of physics at the University of Warwick in 1997, and an honorary professor of physics at Kyushu University in 2010. He became a professor at the University of Warwick in 2012.

Dendy was editor-in-chief of Plasma Physics and Controlled Fusion from 2005 to 2023. In 2018 IOP Publishing established the PPCF Dendy Europe-Asia Pacific Award, named after him.

In 2010, Dendy was appointed as a commissioner of the Marshall Aid Commemoration Commission for a three-year term. He was on the physics sub-panel of the Research Excellence Framework in successive rounds in 2014 and 2021. He chaired the Plasma Physics Division of the European Physical Society from 2016 to 2022.

== Research ==
In 1988, Dendy and Geoff Cottrell wrote an account about superthermal radiation from fusion products in the Joint European Torus. In their paper, they identified a positive slope in the perpendicular velocity distribution of the protons as the cause of the emission. Working with Chris Lashmore-Davies, he then applied kinetic theory to the resonance between the ion Bernstein wave and the fast Alfvén wave and found that multiple cyclotron harmonics can be excited. This mechanism is known as the magnetoacoustic cyclotron instability. The instability had been proposed earlier by Belikov and colleagues, and Dendy applied it to ion cyclotron emission. In his later work, he applied the theory to near-cyclotron frequencies and to oblique propagation. He also proposed a mechanism for ion cyclotron emission from beam ions in the Tokamak Fusion Test Reactor. In 1995 he proposed an analytical form for the distribution function of ions accelerated by heating in the ion cyclotron range of frequencies.

In his work in the area of space plasmas Dendy treated wave generation by ring-like proton velocity distributions, and while working with R. A. Cairns, showed that solitary waves can occur in a plasma of non-thermal electrons and cold ions. He and his colleagues measured the spatial correlation of solar wind fluctuations at 1 AU and its dependence on the solar cycle. He and Kenneth G. McClements applied the surfatron mechanism to the acceleration of electrons at supernova remnant shocks.

Dendy has also worked on sandpile models and self-organised criticality in fusion plasmas. In 2001 he introduced a sandpile model in which sand is added at the centre and escapes during system-wide avalanches. Avalanches in the model have been compared with edge-localised modes in a fusion plasma. He applied the same approach to solar physics and proposed a model of solar flares as cascades of reconnecting magnetic loops.

Dendy found that the dispersion of test particles in drift-wave turbulence is anisotropic, suppressed along the background density gradient and enhanced across it. He and his colleagues later found evidence of anomalous transport of passive particles in two-dimensional plasma turbulence.

Dendy and his colleagues showed that recurrence plots can be constructed without embedding. This result was later used in chemical engineering work on fluidized beds and chemical reactors.

Dendy wrote the textbook Plasma Dynamics, which was published in 1990. He also edited Plasma Physics: An Introductory Course, which was published in 1993.

== Selected publications ==
- Cottrell, G. A.; Dendy, R. O. (1988). "Superthermal radiation from fusion products in JET". Physical Review Letters. 60 (1): 33–36. Bibcode:1988PhRvL..60...33C. doi:10.1103/PhysRevLett.60.33. PMID 10037860.
- Dendy, R. O.; Lashmore-Davies, C. N.; Kam, K. F. (1992). "A possible excitation mechanism for observed superthermal ion cyclotron emission from tokamak plasmas". Physics of Fluids B: Plasma Physics. 4 (12): 3996–4006. Bibcode:1992PhFlB...4.3996D. doi:10.1063/1.860304.
- Cairns, R. A.; Mamun, A. A.; Bingham, R.; Boström, R.; Dendy, R. O.; Nairn, C. M. C.; Shukla, P. K. (1995). "Electrostatic solitary structures in non-thermal plasmas". Geophysical Research Letters. 22 (20): 2709–2712. Bibcode:1995GeoRL..22.2709C. doi:10.1029/95GL02781.
- Dendy, R. O.; Hastie, R. J.; McClements, K. G.; Martin, T. J. (1995). "A model for ideal m=1 internal kink stabilization by minority ion cyclotron resonant heating". Physics of Plasmas. 2 (5): 1623–1636. Bibcode:1995PhPl....2.1623D. doi:10.1063/1.871457.
- Chapman, S. C.; Dendy, R. O.; Hnat, B. (2001). "Sandpile model with tokamaklike enhanced confinement phenomenology". Physical Review Letters. 86 (13): 2814–2817. arXiv:physics/0010032. Bibcode:2001PhRvL..86.2814C. doi:10.1103/PhysRevLett.86.2814. PMID 11290046.
