= Quantum Electronics (journal) =

- Discipline: Laser physics
- Language: English
- Edited by: Oleg N. Krokhin

Publication details
- Former name(s): Soviet Journal of Quantum Electronics
- History: 1971–present
- Publisher: Institute of Physics and Turpion
- Frequency: Monthly
- Impact factor: 1.194 (2022)

Standard abbreviations
- ISO 4: Quantum Electron.

Indexing
- CODEN: SJQEAF
- ISSN: 1063-7818 (print); 1468-4799 (web)
- LCCN: 93646165
- OCLC no.: 288967611

Links
- Journal homepage; Journal homepage at Turpion

Quantum Electronics is a peer-reviewed scientific journal. It is the English edition of the Russian journal "Kvantovaya Elektronika". The editor-in-chief is Oleg N. Krokhin (Lebedev Physical Institute). The journal covers all topics pertaining to laser research and laser applications. Publishing formats include letters, regular papers, discussions, and reviews.

== Continuation ==
This journal was established in 1971 as the Soviet Journal of Quantum Electronics (ISSN 0049-1748). It also appears to be the English edition of this Russian journal from 1971 to 1992, when the English title changed to Quantum Electronics.

== Abstracting and indexing ==
This journal is abstracted and indexed in:

- ISI Alerting Services
- Science Citation Index
- Materials Science Citation Index
- Scopus
- Inspec
- Chemical Abstracts Service
- Compendex
- Atomindex
- NASA Astrophysics Data System
- Physics Abstracts

According to the Journal Citation Reports, the journal has a 2022 impact factor of 1.194.
