= Alexander Golubov =

Russian physicist

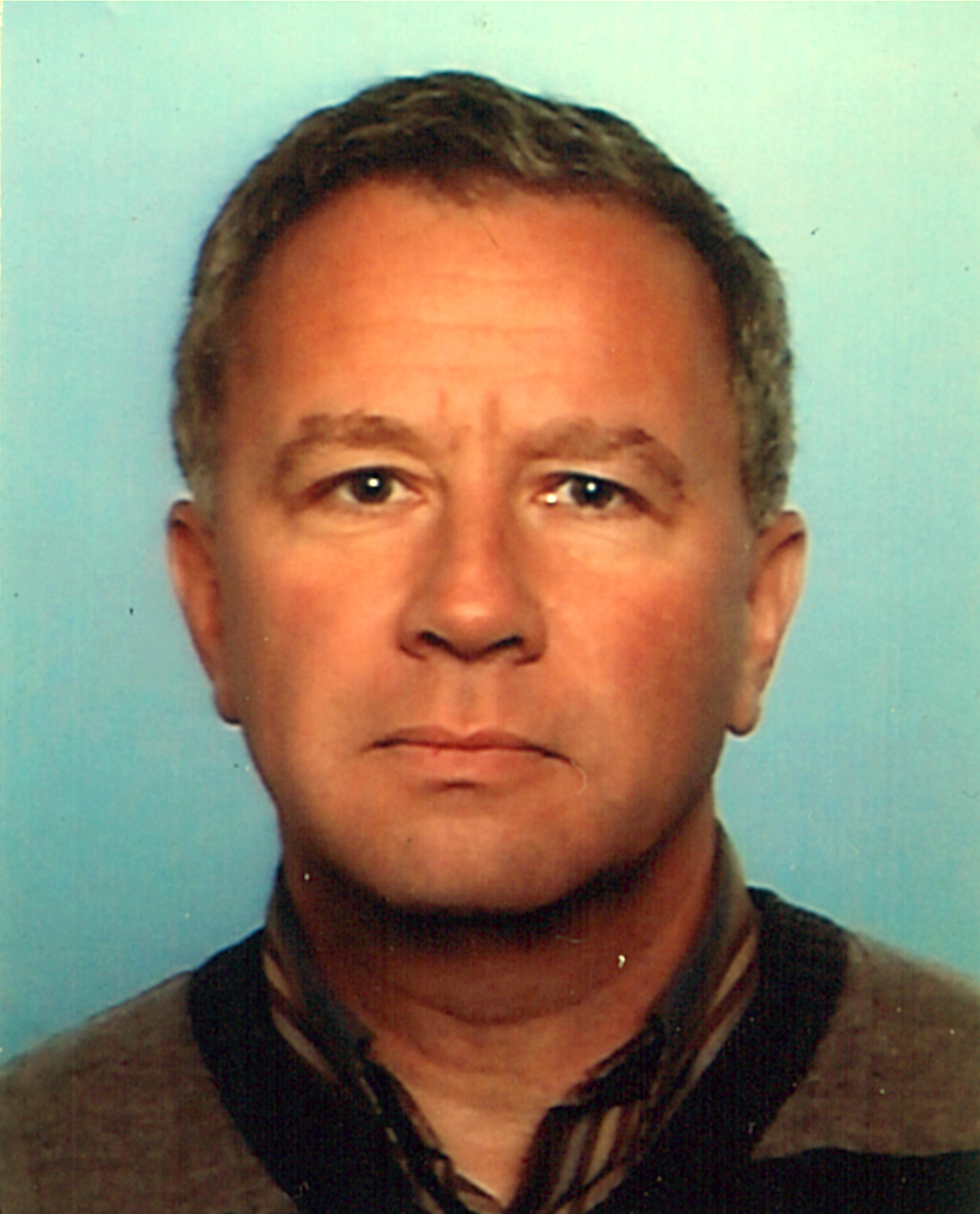
- Born: February 1, 1960 (age 66); Gomel, Belarus Republic, USSR
- Scientific career
- Fields: Theoretical condensed matter physics, with focus on quantum electronic transport in superconducting hybrid structures, proximity and Josephson effects. Physics of electronic and magnetic devices.

Alexander Avraamovitch Golubov (born February 1, 1960) is a doctor of physical and mathematical sciences, associate professor at the University of Twente (Netherlands). He specializes in condensed matter physics with the focus on theory of electronic transport in superconducting devices. He made key contributions to theory of Josephson effect in novel superconducting materials and hybrid structures, and to theory of multiband superconductivity.

== Biography ==
Alexander Golubov was born in Gomel, USSR in 1960. In 1977 he graduated from School 11 in Gomel with profile in physics and mathematics.

In 1983, he graduated from Moscow State Institute of Steels and Alloys, the Physical-Chemistry Faculty, at the Chair of theoretical physics guided by Nobel prize winner Alexey Abrikosov.

In 1987, he earned his PhD at the Institute of Solid State Physics at the Russian Academy of Science in Chernogolovka and then worked as a researcher in theoretical department of this institute. In 1997 he got doctoral degree (Habilitation).

From 1990 to 1991, he worked as a postdoc at the Department of Physics, RWTH Aachen, Germany and in 1995 to 1996 worked as a guest scientist at the Forschungszentrum Juelich (FA), Germany.

Since 1997, he is a professor at the Faculty of Science and Technology at the University of Twente, the Netherlands.

In 2013 won a mega-grant competition announced by Russian government in order to investigate topological quantum phenomena in superconducting hybrid structures. Since 2014 a number of world-class scientific results were obtained within this project in the field of topological quantum phenomena in the contacts of superconductors with semiconductor and ferromagnetic nanowires and thin films

From 2018 an EU partner of the project SPINTECH, which is supported by the EU Horizon 2020 program. The aim of the SPINTECH project is to boost the scientific excellence and innovation capacity in the field of spintronics – especially in the development of advanced technology for design and production of superconducting spin-valves.

In 2021 elected as a Fellow of the American Physical Society(APS).

== Memberships and awards ==
- Fellow of the American Physical Society(APS)
- Winner of Megagrant from Russian government (2013) "Topological quantum phenomena in superconducting structures"
- Coordinator of the project "SPINTECH" which received funding from the European Union's Horizon 2020 research and innovation programme under grant agreement No 810144 (2018 – 2022)
- Outstanding referee APS Journals (2014) and Europhysics Letters (2015)
- Advisory Board member of the journal "Superconducting Science and Technology"

== Selected publications ==
- V.V.Ryazanov, A.V.Veretennikov, V.A.Oboznov, A.Y.Rusanov, A.A.Golubov, and J.Aarts. 'Coupling of two superconductors through a ferromagnet: Evidence for a pi-junction'. Phys. Rev. Lett. 86, 2427 (2001).
- A.A. Golubov, M. Yu. Kupriyanov, and E. Il'ichev. 'The current-phase relation in Josephson junctions'. Review of Modern Physics 76, 411 (2004).
- J. Kortus, O. V. Dolgov, R. K. Kremer, and A. A. Golubov. 'Band Filling and Interband Scattering Effects in MgB2: Carbon versus Aluminum Doping'. Phys. Rev. Lett. 94, 027002 (2005).
- A.E. Koshelev and A. A. Golubov. 'Why magnesium diboride is not described by anisotropic Ginzburg-Landau theory'. Phys. Rev. Lett. 92, 107008 (2004).
- Y.Tanaka and A.A.Golubov,'Theory of the proximity effect in junctions with unconventional superconductors', Phys. Rev. Lett. 98, 037003 (2007).
- Y.Asano, Y. Tanaka, and A. A. Golubov, 'Josephson Effect due to Odd-Frequency Pairs in Diffusive Half Metals', Phys. Rev. Lett. 98, 107002 (2007).
- L. Boeri, O.V. Dolgov, and .A.A. Golubov, 'Is LaO1-xFxFeAs an electron-phonon superconductor ?', Phys. Rev. Lett. 101, 026403 (2008).
- A. A. Golubov, A. Brinkman, Yukio Tanaka, I. I. Mazin, and O. V. Dolgov, 'Andreev Spectra and Subgap Bound States in Multiband Superconductors', Phys. Rev. Lett. 103, 077003 (2009).
- N. Poccia, T.I. Baturina, F. Coneri, C.G. Molenaar, X.R. Wang, G. Bianconi, A. Brinkman, H. Hilgenkamp, A.A. Golubov, and Valerii M. Vinokur, 'Critical behavior at a dynamic vortex insulator-to-metal transition', Science 349, 1203 (2015)
- A.A. Golubov and M.Yu.Kupriyanov, "Controlling magnetism", Nature Materials 16, 156 (2017)
- V.S. Stolyarov, T. Cren, C. Brun, I.A. Golovchanskiy, O.A. Skryabuna, D.I. Kasatonov, M.M. Khapaev, A.A. Golubov, D. Roditchev, "Expansion of a superconducting vortex core into a diffusive metal", Nature Communications 9, 2277 (2018)
- C. Li, J. C. de Boer, B. de Ronde, S. V. Ramankutty, E. van Heumen, Y. Huang, Anne de Visser, Alexander A. Golubov, Mark S. Golden, Alexander Brinkman, "4π-periodic Andreev bound states in a Dirac semimetal", Nature Materials 17, 875 (2018)
- Chuan Li, Bob de Ronde, Jorrit de Boer, Joost Ridderbos, Floris Zwanenburg, Yingkai Huang, Alexander Golubov, and Alexander Brinkman /. "Zeeman-Effect-Induced 0−π Transitions in Ballistic Dirac Semimetal Josephson Junctions", Phys. Rev. Lett.123, 026802 (2019)
- P. Schüffelgen , D. Rosenbach, C. Li, T. W. Schmitt, G. Mussler, E. Berenschot, N. Tas, A. A. Golubov , A. Brinkman, Th. Schäpers and D. Grützmacher, 'Selective area growth and stencil lithography for in situ fabricated quantum devices', Nature Nanotechnology 14, 82 (2019)
