= Journal of Instrumentation =

- Discipline: Instrumentation
- Language: English
- Edited by: Marzio Nessi

Publication details
- History: 2006-present
- Publisher: International School for Advanced Studies, Institute of Physics
- Frequency: Monthly
- Open access: Hybrid
- License: CC BY 3.0 (open access part)
- Impact factor: 1.4 (2025)

Standard abbreviations
- ISO 4: J. Instrum.

Indexing
- CODEN: JIONAS
- ISSN: 1748-0221
- OCLC no.: 150410732

Links
- Journal homepage

The Journal of Instrumentation is an online peer-reviewed scientific journal. It is published by IOP Publishing on behalf of the International School for Advanced Studies.

The journal covers concept and instrumentation in topic areas related to, and including detector and accelerator science, including related theory, simulations, modelling, and experimental methods.

== Abstracting and indexing ==
The journal is abstracted and indexed in:

- Scopus
- Inspec
- Chemical Abstracts Service
- INIS Atomindex
- NASA Astrophysics Data System
- Science Citation Index
- Materials Science Citation Index

According to the Journal Citation Reports, the journal has a 2025 impact factor of 1.4.

== Notable articles ==
The journal publishes the complete scientific documentation of the CERN Large Hadron Collider machine and detectors. These papers are published as open access. It also publishes the technical reports concerning the Planck Low Frequency Instrument on board the European Space Agency's Planck satellite, which was launched in May 2009, and the three-volume technical report of the Deep Underground Neutrino Experiment (DUNE). These papers are also published as open access.
