= Paola Taroni =

Italian engineer and physicist

- Born: 1963 (age 62–63); Como
- Education: Polytechnic University of Milan
- Scientific career
- Workplaces: Polytechnic University of Milan

Paola Taroni (born 1963) is an Italian engineer and physicist who works at the Polytechnic University of Milan. Her research considers the development of optical approaches for cancer diagnoses. She has held various leadership positions.

== Early life and education ==
Taroni was born in Como. She studied nuclear engineering at the Polytechnic University of Milan. Her doctorate considered the development of instrumentation for optical mammography. She performed fluorescence spectroscopy of molecular probes. After earning her degree, she moved to the Massachusetts Institute of Technology as a visiting research, where she worked alongside Harrison.

== Research and career ==
Taroni joined the CNR as a researcher in 1988. She was made associate professor at the Polytechnic of Milan in 1999, and Full Professor in 2011. Her research considers the development of optical diagnostic methods for cancer. Optical approaches are non-invasive and can be used for screening and monitoring. She has shown that by measuring the optical properties (absorption, diffusion) of brast cancer tissue and applying diffusion theory it is possible to understand the microscopic structure of the tissue. Taroni has shown that the acquisition of time-resolved transmittance data at multiple geometries can be used to calculate both breast tissue density and collagen content, which are both risk factors for tumour development.

Taroni coordinated H2020 “Smart Optical and Ultrasound Diagnostics of Breast Cancer” (SOLUS). SOLUS uses diffuse optical imaging to characterise several different parameters simultaneously, which can help with accurate diagnoses and avoid false positives.

Taroni has contributed to several international photobiology societies, including the Italian Society of Photobiology, European Society for Photobiology and American Society for Photobiology. She organised several scientific conferences, including SPIE BiOS, OSA Biomedical Topical Meetings and European Conferences on Biomedical Optics.

== Selected publications ==
- R Cubeddu; Pifferi, Antonio; Taroni, Paola; Torricelli, Alessandro; Valentini, Gianluca (1997). "A solid tissue phantom for photon migration studies". Physics in Medicine and Biology. 42 (10): 1971–1979. doi:10.1088/0031-9155/42/10/011. PMID 9364593. Wikidata Q63441685.
- R Cubeddu; D Comelli; C D'Andrea; P Taroni; G Valentini (2002). "Time-resolved fluorescence imaging in biology and medicine". Journal of Physics D. 35 (9): R61–R76. doi:10.1088/0022-3727/35/9/201. Wikidata Q63441645.
- Taroni, Paola; Antonio Pifferi; Alessandro Torricelli; Daniela Comelli; Rinaldo Cubeddu (2003). "In vivo absorption and scattering spectroscopy of biological tissues". Photochemical and Photobiological Sciences. 2 (2): 124–129. doi:10.1039/b209651j. PMID 12664972. Wikidata Q35094471.
