= Laura Harkness-Brennan =

British physicist

Laura Joanne Harkness
- Education: University of Liverpool
- Scientific career
- Workplaces: University of Liverpool
- Thesis: A Design Study of the Semiconductor Sensor Head for the ProSPECTus Compton camera (2010)

Laura Joanne Harkness is a British physicist who is a professor and Pro-Vice Chancellor at the University of Liverpool. Her research focusses on the development of radiation detectors for gamma-ray spectroscopy and imaging. She was awarded the Institute of Physics Jocelyn Bell-Burnell Prize in 2010.

== Early life and education ==
Harkness completed her master's and doctorate in physics at the University of Liverpool. Her doctorate studied the semiconductor sensor array using the ProSPECTus camera. ProSPECTus uses segmented semiconductors in a Compton camera to achieve high resolution single-photon emission computed tomography (SPECT). Compton cameras rely on Compton light–matter interactions to detect gamma rays, describing the trajectory using photoelectric absorption, Compton scattering and pair production. The ProSPECTus includes two cryogenically cooled semiconductor detectors (made of silicon and germanium).

== Research and career ==
Harkness joined the faculty of the University of Liverpool as a Lecturer in 2014, moving to Senior Lecturer, and then Reader in 2019. In 2021, she was appointed Chair in Physics and Associate Pro-Vice-Chancellor for Research and Impact.

Harkness develops radiation detectors for gamma ray spectroscopy for medical imaging and Fermilab. She is interested in the application of nuclear physics to cancer diagnostics. She created the Science and Technology Facilities Council Cancer Diagnosis Network that looks to accelerate diagnosis and treatment of cancer using advances in medical imaging. In 2023, she was appointed as a member of the National Physical Laboratory (NPL) Science and Technology Advisory Council and a UKRI Interdisciplinary Assessment College (IAC) Chair.

In May 2025, she was announced as the University of Liverpool's next Pro-Vice-Chancellor and Head of the Faculty of Science and Engineering, from September 2025.

== Awards and honours ==
- 2010 Institute of Physics Very Early Career Award
- 2015 Women of the Future Award for Science, highly commended
- 2024 Applied Nuclear Physics Prize of the European Physical Society “in recognition of her outstanding contribution to the application of advanced gamma-ray spectroscopy together with imaging technology and techniques to the areas of nuclear medical imaging, homeland security, nuclear decommissioning and environmental monitoring”

== Selected publications ==
- Harkness-Brennan, Laura (2018-06-01). An Introduction to the Physics of Nuclear Medicine. Morgan & Claypool Publishers. Bibcode:2018ipnm.book.....H. doi:10.1088/978-1-6432-7034-0. ISBN 978-1-64327-034-0.
- S. Akkoyun; Algora, Alejandro; B. Alikhani; et al. (2012). "AGATA—Advanced GAmma Tracking Array". Nuclear Instruments and Methods in Physics Research. 668: 26–58. arXiv:1111.5731. doi:10.1016/j.nima.2011.11.081. Wikidata Q59238863.
- N. Abgrall; A. Abramov; N. Abrosimov; et al. (2017). "The large enriched germanium experiment for neutrinoless double beta decay (LEGEND)". AIP Conference Proceedings. arXiv:1709.01980. doi:10.1063/1.5007652. Wikidata Q57714763.
- A. Tarifeño-Saldivia; J.L. Tain; C. Domingo-Pardo; et al. (2017). "Conceptual design of a hybrid neutron-gamma detector for study of β-delayed neutrons at the RIB facility of RIKEN". Journal of Instrumentation. 12 (04): P04006–P04006. arXiv:1606.05544. doi:10.1088/1748-0221/12/04/p04006. Wikidata Q61731523.
