= Materials Research Bulletin =

- Discipline: Materials science
- Language: English
- Edited by: Rick Ubic

Publication details
- History: 1966–present
- Publisher: Elsevier
- Impact factor: 5.6 (2021)

Standard abbreviations
- ISO 4: Mater. Res. Bull.

Indexing
- ISSN: 0025-5408

Links
- Journal homepage; Online archive

Materials Research Bulletin is a peer-reviewed, scientific journal that covers the study of materials science and engineering. The journal is published by Elsevier and was established in 1966. The Editor-in-Chief is Rick Ubic.

The journal focuses on the development and understanding of materials, including their properties, structure, and processing, and the application of these materials in various fields. The scope of the journal includes the following areas: ceramics, metals, polymers, composites, electronic and optical materials, and biomaterials.

Materials Research Bulletin features original research articles, review articles, and short communications.

== Abstracting and indexing ==
The journal is abstracted and indexed for example in:

- Materials Science Citation Index
- Chemical Abstracts
- Cambridge Scientific Abstracts
- Scopus
- Web of Science

According to the Journal Citation Reports, the journal has a 2021 impact factor of 5.6.
