= Plasma Physics and Controlled Fusion =

- Discipline: Plasma physics
- Language: English
- Edited by: Jonathan P Graves

Publication details
- Former name: Plasma Physics
- History: 1960–present
- Publisher: IOP Publishing
- Frequency: Monthly
- Impact factor: 2.3 (2024)

Standard abbreviations
- ISO 4: Plasma Phys. Control. Fusion

Indexing
- CODEN: PPCFET
- ISSN: 0741-3335 (print); 1361-6587 (web)
- LCCN: 84643710
- OCLC no.: 47189965

Links
- Journal homepage

Plasma Physics and Controlled Fusion is a monthly peer-reviewed scientific journal covering plasma physics. It is published by the Institute of Physics and the Editor-in-Chief is Jonathan P Graves (EPFL/University of York). The journal was established in 1960 as Plasma Physics, obtaining its current title in 1984.

== Abstracting and indexing ==
The journal is abstracted and indexed in:

- Chemical Abstracts Service
- EI Compendex
- Current Contents:Physical, Chemical & Earth Sciences
- INIS Atomindex
- Inspec
- NASA Astrophysics Data System
- Referativny Zhurnal
- Science Citation Index
- Scopus

According to the Journal Citation Reports, the journal has a 2024 impact factor of 2.3.
