= Kristie J. Koski =

American professor of chemistry

Kristie J. Koski is an associate professor of Physical Chemistry in the Department of Chemistry at the University of California, Davis.

== Education and career ==
Originally from Powell, Wyoming, she acquired her Bachelors of Science in Physics, another Bachelors of Science in Chemistry, as well as a minor in Latin at the University of Wyoming in 2002. She relocated to California to attend graduate school and obtain her PhD at University of California, Berkeley, specializing in Physical Chemistry where she also simultaneously worked in the Alivisatos group which studied nanomaterials. Koski moved to Arizona for a brief period to start her postdoctoral studies at Arizona State University. During her time in Arizona State University, Koski studied and analyzed the mechanical properties of spider silk. Koski moved back to California once again, as a postdoct in Materials Science and Engineering at Stanford University.

After completing her postdoctoral studies of Material Science and Engineering at Stanford University, Koski moved to Providence, Rhode Island to be an Assistant Professor in the Chemistry Department at Brown University in 2013. In 2016, Koski left Brown University and moved to the Department of Chemistry at the University of California, Davis.

While at the University of California, Davis, Koski would become the lead investigator of her own lab. The goals of her lab include, “spanning physics, chemistry, and material science & engineering”. The current research is centered around two-dimensional (2D) layered nanomaterials. Their work incorporates every facet of 2D nanomaterials, including: developing novel synthetic growth methods and new chemical methods/techniques for electro-optical tailoring, optical property measurements, and direct application. She received tenure in 2024, after a prolonged tenure case.

== Awards and professional highlights ==
Koski has published research papers ranging from Physical Review Materials to The Journal of Chemical Physics and Journal of Physics. Additionally, Koski was awarded the National Science Foundation CAREER Award in 2015. Another award that Koski received was the Nano Research Young Innovator (NR45) Award in nanoenergy. The NR45 award is offered to “young researchers in various fields of nanoscience and nanotechnology, in recognition of their distinguished accomplishments and/or potential to make substantial contributions to their fields”.
