= Journal of Physics: Condensed Matter =

- Discipline: Condensed matter physics
- Language: English
- Edited by: Peter A. Dowben

Publication details
- History: 1989-present
- Publisher: IOP Publishing (United Kingdom)
- Frequency: Weekly
- Open access: Hybrid
- Impact factor: 2.9 (2025)

Standard abbreviations
- ISO 4: J. Phys. Condens. Matter

Indexing
- CODEN: JCOMEL
- ISSN: 0953-8984 (print); 1361-648X (web)
- LCCN: 89655558
- OCLC no.: 34482386

Links
- Journal homepage

Journal of Physics: Condensed Matter is a weekly peer-reviewed scientific journal established in 1989 and published by IOP Publishing. The journal covers all areas of condensed matter physics, including soft matter and nanostructures. The editor-in-chief is Peter A. Dowben from the University of Nebraska-Lincoln.

The journal was formed by the merger of Journal of Physics C: Solid State Physics and Journal of Physics F: Metal Physics in 1989.

== Abstracting and indexing ==
This journal is abstracted and indexed in:

- Aerospace and High Technology Database
- Chemical Abstracts
- Compendex
- Current Contents/Physical, Chemical & Earth Sciences
- Environmental Sciences & Pollution Management
- GeoRef
- Inspec
- International Nuclear Information System
- Materials Science Citation Index
- NASA Astrophysics Data System
- PASCAL
- Science Citation Index Expanded
- Scopus
- VINITI Database RAS

According to the Journal Citation Reports, the journal has a 2025 impact factor of 2.9.
