= Inverse Problems =

- Discipline: Interdisciplinary
- Language: English
- Edited by: Otmar Scherzer

Publication details
- History: 1985–present
- Publisher: IOP Publishing (UK)
- Frequency: 12
- Open access: Hybrid
- Impact factor: 2.0 (2023)

Standard abbreviations
- ISO 4: Inverse Probl.
- MathSciNet: Inverse Problems

Indexing
- CODEN: INPEEY
- ISSN: 0266-5611 (print); 1361-6420 (web)

Links
- Journal homepage

Inverse Problems is a peer-reviewed, broad-based interdisciplinary journal for pure and applied mathematicians and physicists produced by IOP Publishing. It combines theoretical, experimental and mathematical papers on inverse problems with numerical and practical approaches to their solution. The journal has a specialized relevance to workers in geophysics, optics, radar, acoustics, communication theory, signal processing and medical imaging.

Pierre Sabatier was the founding editor in 1985. The editor-in-chief is Otmar Scherzer at University of Vienna, Austria.

It is indexed in Applied Mechanics Reviews, INSPEC Information Services, ISI (Science Citation Index, SciSearch, ISI Alerting Services, COMPUMATH Citation Index, Current Contents/Physical, Chemical and Earth Sciences), Mathematical Reviews, Current Mathematical Publications, MathSciNet, Article@INIST, Engineering Index/Ei Compendex, Zentralblatt MATH, and VINITI Abstracts Journal.

== See also ==
- Journal of Physics A
- Nonlinearity
