= Physics in Medicine and Biology =

Physics in Medicine & Biology
- Discipline: Medical physics
- Language: English
- Edited by: Katia Parodi

Publication details
- History: 1956–present
- Publisher: IOP Publishing on behalf of the Institute of Physics and Engineering in Medicine
- Frequency: Biweekly
- Open access: Hybrid
- Impact factor: 3.4 (2024)

Standard abbreviations
- ISO 4: Phys. Med. Biol.

Indexing
- CODEN: PHMBA7
- ISSN: 0031-9155 (print); 1361-6560 (web)
- LCCN: 58049741
- OCLC no.: 1762343

Links
- Journal homepage

Physics in Medicine & Biology is a biweekly peer-reviewed medical journal covering research on the application of physics to medicine, physiology, and biology. It was established in 1956 and is published by IOP Publishing on behalf of the Institute of Physics and Engineering in Medicine. It is also an official journal of the following medical societies: Canadian Organization of Medical Physics, Deutsche Gesellschaft für Medizinische Physik, Japanese Association of Radiological Physics, European Federation of Organisations for Medical Physics, and the International Organization for Medical Physics. The editor-in-chief is Katia Parodi (LMU Munich).

== Abstracting and indexing ==
The journal is abstracted and indexed in:

- Inspec
- Chemical Abstracts
- BIOSIS Previews/Biological Abstracts
- Compendex
- Embase/Excerpta Medica
- PASCAL
- Science Citation Index
- Current Contents
- Index Medicus/MEDLINE/PubMed
- VINITI Database RAS

According to the Journal Citation Reports, the journal has a 2024 impact factor of 3.4.
