= Anatoly B. Kolomeisky =

Academic

Anatoly Boris Kolomeisky (Russian: Анатолий Борис Коломейский; born September 3, 1967) is a professor of Chemistry, Chemical and Biomolecular Engineering, Physics and Astronomy and chairman of the department of Chemistry at Rice University in Houston, Texas.

Kolomeisky specializes in theoretical chemistry and theoretical biophysics using methods of statistical mechanics.

== Early life and education ==
Born in Vinnitsa in what was the Soviet Union, Kolomeisky received his M.Sc. (with honors) in Chemistry from Moscow State University in 1991. In 1992 Kolomeisky went to the United States, where he attended the University of Kentucky (1993-1994) and then Cornell University in 1994 for his graduate studies.

Kolomeisky obtained his Ph.D. (summa cum laude) from Cornell in 1998 working under supervision of Professor Ben Widom. Kolomeisky's Ph.D. research focused on theoretical investigations of one-dimensional stochastic models for studying various biological and chemical processes.

== Career ==
After completing his Ph.D. in 1998, he joined the group of Prof. Michael E. Fisher at University of Maryland at College Park as a postdoctoral research associate. Working there, Kolomeisky became involved in a variety of theoretical investigations on mechanisms of complex physical, chemical and biological systems.

Kolomeisky developed a lattice version of Debye-Huckel theory for electrolytes, and he also developed a first theoretical description of the force generation mechanisms by motor proteins and biological molecular motors. In 2000 Kolomeisky joined Department of Chemistry at Rice University as an Assistant Professor and he became a Full Professor there in 2011. In 2018 Kolomeisky became the Department Chair of Chemistry at Rice and in 2019 added a joint appointment with department of Physics and Astronomy.

== Research ==
Kolomeisky leads a multi-disciplinary research group focused on theoretical modeling of complex physical, chemical and biological processes using methods of statistical mechanics. He investigated in detail the dynamic properties of one-dimensional asymmetric simple exclusion processes (ASEP) and applied it for various systems Kolomeisky, together with experimental collaborators, also intensively studied the molecular transport through channels and nanopores

In addition, Kolomeisky developed a new theoretical framework for analyzing dynamics of protein-DNA interactions. Furthermore, Kolomeisky was actively involved in theoretical studies of the formation of morphogen gradients in biological signaling systems, of the genome interrogation by CRISPR systems, understanding mechanisms of biological error correction, investigations of the mechanisms of cytoskeleton protein filaments dynamics, and the dynamics of cancer formation.

Kolomeisky co-authored more than 210 publications, 9 invited review papers and 5 book chapters. In 2015 he wrote a book "Motor Proteins in Molecular Motors." He is currently the editor of the Biophysical Journal. He also served as a guest editor for Journal of Physics: Condensed Matter.

== Awards and honors ==
Kolomeisky received a Humboldt Research Fellowship for Experienced Scientists in 2008. In 2015 he was elected a Fellow of the American Physical Society for "major advances in the field of theoretical biophysics by fundamental contributions to the understanding of the mechanisms of motor proteins, cytoskeleton dynamics, protein nucleation, channel transport, and protein-DNA interactions."
