= Joan Redwing =

American materials scientist

- Education: University of Pittsburgh (BS); University of Wisconsin–Madison (PhD)
- Awards: APS Fellow (2012); MRS Fellow (2015); AAAS Fellow (2016)
- Scientific career
- Fields: Electronic materials
- Workplaces: Pennsylvania State University (2000–present)
- Thesis: A study of dopant incorporation into gallium arsenide grown by metal-organic vapor phase epitaxy (1994)
- Website: sites.psu.edu/redwing/

Joan M. Redwing is an American materials scientist known for research on electronic and optoelectronic materials, including the processing of semiconductor thin films and nanomaterials by metalorganic chemical vapor deposition (MOCVD). Redwing is a distinguished professor of materials science and engineering and electrical engineering at Pennsylvania State University and director of the university's 2D Crystal Consortium research facility. She is a fellow of the American Association for the Advancement of Science, the American Physical Society, and the Materials Research Society.

== Education and career ==
Joan M. Redwing attended the University of Pittsburgh, Pennsylvania, where she received a bachelor of science in chemical engineering in 1986. After graduation, from 1986 to 1988, she worked at General Electric Corporate Research & Development in New York where her work was focused on tungsten-coated X-ray targets produced by chemical vapor deposition. She pursued a doctoral degree in chemical engineering from the University of Wisconsin–Madison under the advisement of Thomas Kuech. She received her degree in 1994; her thesis was A study of dopant incorporation into gallium arsenide grown by metal-organic vapor phase epitaxy.

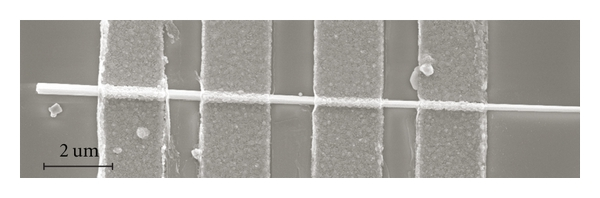
Scanning electron microscope image of a gallium nitride nanowire from a 2011 publication co-authored by Redwing

Redwing joined Advanced Technology Materials Inc., in Connecticut, as a research engineer, where she researched group III-nitride semiconductors grown by MOCVD, especially aluminum gallium arsenide (AlGaN) and gallium nitride (GaN) two-dimensional electron gas heterostructures, and co-authored several patents. She moved to Epitronics Inc., an Arizona subsidiary of ATMI, in 1997 where she held the position of Manager of III-V Technology and led a epitaxial wafer manufacturing group. She joined the faculty of Pennsylvania State University (PSU) in 2000 as an assistant professor with appointments in the Department of Materials Science and Engineering and the Department of Electrical Engineering. She continued studying group III-nitride semiconductors at PSU and began research on synthesizing semiconductor nanowires, in particular those made from silicon or silicon/silicon–germanium for usage in nanoelectronics and photovoltaics, among other subjects.

In 2014, Redwing's research group was one of three groups at the university's Center for Two-dimensional and Layered Materials (2DLM) that received an award from the National Science Foundation (NSF) to research 2D materials. As a 2016 Fulbright Scholar to Sweden, Redwing spent three months at Lund University with the research group of Lars-Erik Wernersson to study III-V nanowire materials as replacements for conventional silicon semiconductors. She has been director and synthesis lead of the Two-Dimensional Crystal Consortium (2DCC), a materials research facility at Penn State that received NSF funding starting in 2016, where her group has continued research on 2D materials. She was named a Distinguished Professor in 2022.

Redwing has served as an editor of the Journal of Crystal Growth and on the executive editorial board of 2D Materials. She co-chaired the 2018 Materials Research Society Fall Meeting with four others.

== Recognition ==
Redwing was elected a Fellow of the American Physical Society in 2012, after a nomination from the APS Division of Materials Physics, for "key contributions to the mechanistic understanding of materials synthesis by vapor growth, including Si and SiGe nanowires, group-III nitrides and boride-based superconductors."

In 2015, she was named a Fellow of the Materials Research Society, a distinction conferred to members whose "sustained and distinguished contributions to the advancement of materials research are internationally recognized". In the following year she was named a Fellow of the American Association for the Advancement of Science for "key contributions to the understanding of materials synthesis of nanostructured materials including nanowires, 2D structures, group-III nitrides, topological insulators and boride-based superconductors."
