= William Curtin =

American materials scientist

William A. Curtin
- Education: Brown University; Cornell University
- Awards: Guggenheim Fellowship (2005-06)
- Scientific career
- Fields: Materials Science; Theoretical Physics
- Workplaces: Brown University; Ecole Polytechnique Fédérale de Lausanne

William A. Curtin is an American materials scientist who is Elisha Benjamin Andrews Professor at Brown University in Providence, Rhode Island.

From 2011 to 2022, he was director of the Institute of Mechanical Engineering at École Polytechnique Fédérale de Lausanne (EPFL) in Switzerland. He received a Guggenheim Fellowship in 2005.

His research interests span a wide range of topics in materials science and theoretical physics, including the mechanics of materials, multiscale modeling, and the properties of metal alloys and composites. He is the author of several high-impact publications in the field of materials science.

He was editor-in-chief of Modelling and Simulation in Materials Science and Engineering for more than ten years until 2016.

Curtin proposed a new model for the Portevin–Le Chatelier effect (PLC effect), which is based on the "single-atomic-hop motion of solutes from the compression to the tension side of a dislocation core." This model provides a predictive framework for understanding dynamic strain ageing (DSA) in these alloys, offering new insights into the microscopic interactions that lead to macroscopic material behaviors.
