= Journal of Physics =

Journal of Physics is a peer-reviewed scientific journal series published by IOP Publishing; it currently consists of the following journals.

- Journal of Physics A: Mathematical and Theoretical
- Journal of Physics B: Atomic, Molecular and Optical Physics
- Journal of Physics D: Applied Physics
- Journal of Physics G: Nuclear and Particle Physics
- Journal of Physics Communications
- Journal of Physics: Complexity
- Journal of Physics: Condensed Matter (merger of Journal of Physics C: Solid State Physics and Journal of Physics F: Metal Physics)
- Journal of Physics: Conference Series
- Journal of Physics: Energy
- Journal of Physics: Materials
- Journal of Physics: Photonics

The following journals were formerly published in the series.

- Journal of Physics C: Solid State Physics (merged with Journal of Physics F)
- Journal of Physics E: Scientific Instruments (renamed as Measurement Science and Technology)
- Journal of Physics F: Metal Physics (merged with Journal of Physics C)

== See also ==
- Measurement Science and Technology#History
