= 2D Materials (journal) =

- Discipline: 2D materials, physics
- Language: English
- Edited by: Wencai Ren

Publication details
- History: 2014–present
- Publisher: IOP Publishing
- Frequency: Monthly
- Open access: Hybrid
- Impact factor: 4.3 (2025)

Standard abbreviations
- ISO 4: 2D Mater.

Indexing
- ISSN: 2053-1583

Links
- Journal homepage

2D Materials is a monthly peer-reviewed scientific journal published by IOP Publishing. It covers fundamental and applied research in two-dimensional materials science and engineering. It includes experimental, theoretical, and applied studies on materials such as graphene, silicene, boron nitride, and transition metal dichalcogenides, along with related synthesis and fabrication techniques. The journal publishes original research articles, Perspectives, and invited Topical Reviews of multidisciplinary interest. The editor-in-chief is Wencai Ren (Chinese Academy of Sciences).

== Abstracting and indexing ==
The journal is abstracted and indexed in:

- Astrophysics Data System
- Chemical Abstracts
- Ei Compendex
- Inspec
- International Nuclear Information System
- ProQuest databases
- Science Citation Index Expanded
- Scopus

According to the Journal Citation Reports, the journal has a 2025 impact factor of 4.3.
