= Der Internist =

- Discipline: Internal medicine
- Language: German
- Edited by: M. Battegay, W.L. Gross, M. Hallek, H. Haller, G. Hasenfuß, W. Hiddemann, H. Lehnert, E. Märker-Hermann, M.P. Manns, J. Mössner, M. Reincke, S.M. Schellong, C. Vogelmeier, K. Werdan

Publication details
- History: 1960-present
- Publisher: Springer Science+Business Media
- Frequency: Monthly
- Impact factor: 0.329 (2012)

Standard abbreviations
- ISO 4: Internist

Indexing
- ISSN: 0020-9554 (print); 1432-1289 (web)
- OCLC no.: 300181377

Links
- Journal homepage; Online archive

Der Internist (The Internist) is a monthly German language medical journal published by Springer Science+Business Media. In 2007, it was ranked among the largest German scientific journals in terms of revenue.

== Abstracting and indexing ==
The journal is abstracted and indexed in:

- Science Citation Index
- PubMed/MEDLINE
- Scopus
- EMBASE
- CAB International
- Academic OneFile
- CAB Abstracts
- Current Contents/Clinical Medicine
- Global Health
- INIS Atomindex

According to the Journal Citation Reports, Der Internist has a 2012 impact factor of 0.329.
