= Journal of Geophysics and Engineering =

- Discipline: Geophysics and Engineering
- Language: English
- Edited by: Yanghua Wang, Qinyong Yang

Publication details
- History: 2004–present
- Publisher: IOP Publishing (United Kingdom)
- Frequency: Bimonthly
- Impact factor: 1.6 (2023)

Standard abbreviations
- ISO 4: J. Geophys. Eng.

Indexing
- CODEN: JGE0C3
- ISSN: 1742-2132 (print); 1742-2140 (web)

Links
- Journal homepage

The Journal of Geophysics and Engineering is a peer-reviewed scientific journal covering research and developments in geophysics and related areas of engineering. Although the journal has a predominantly applied science and engineering focus, it also publishes contributions in all Earth-physics disciplines from global geophysics to applied and engineering geophysics. The editors-in-chief are Yanghua Wang (Imperial College London) and Qinyong Yang (Sinopec Geophysical Research Institute).

== Abstracting and indexing ==
The Journal of Geophysics and Engineering is abstracted and indexed in Science Citation Index Expanded, Current Contents/Engineering, Computing and Technology, Current Contents/Physical, Chemical and Earth Sciences, Inspec, Scopus, Astrophysics Data System, and GEOBASE. According to the Journal Citation Reports, the journal has a 2017 impact factor of 1.411.
