= Journal of Statistical Mechanics: Theory and Experiment =

Peer-reviewed scientific journal

- Discipline: Statistical physics
- Language: English

Publication details
- History: 2004-present
- Publisher: International School for Advanced Studies and IOP Publishing
- Frequency: Monthly
- Open access: Hybrid
- Impact factor: 2.2 (2023)

Standard abbreviations
- ISO 4: J. Stat. Mech.: Theory Exp.

Indexing
- ISSN: 1742-5468
- OCLC no.: 54488282

Links
- Journal homepage

The Journal of Statistical Mechanics: Theory and Experiment is a peer-reviewed scientific journal published by the International School for Advanced Studies and IOP Publishing. The journal is targeted to scientists interested in different aspects of statistical physics. The editor-in-chief is Marc Mézard (CNRS, University of Paris-Sud and École Normale Supérieure).

== Abstracting and indexing ==
The journal is abstracted and indexed in:

- Astrophysics Data System
- Chemical Abstracts Service
- Inspec
- MathSciNet
- Scopus
- SPIRES
- Science Citation Index Expanded
- Zentralblatt MATH
