= Izvestia (disambiguation) =

Izvestia (Russian: Известия; alternative transliteration: Izvestiya, Izvestija) may refer to:

- Izvestia, a Russian newspaper
- Novye Izvestia, a Russian newspaper, founded by former journalists of Izvestia
- Izvestia (horse), a racehorse
- Izvestija Trophy, an ice hockey tournament held in the Soviet Union
- Izvestiya: Mathematics, a mathematical journal
