= EPL (journal) =

- Discipline: Physics
- Language: English
- Edited by: Richard Blythe

Publication details
- Former name(s): Europhysics Letters
- Publisher: EDP Sciences; IOP Publishing; Italian Physical Society
- Frequency: Biweekly
- Open access: Hybrid
- Impact factor: 1.8 (2023)

Standard abbreviations
- ISO 4: EPL

Indexing
- CODEN: EULEE8
- ISSN: 0295-5075 (print); 1286-4854 (web)

Links
- Iop Science; Epletters.net

EPL is a peer-reviewed scientific journal published by EDP Sciences, IOP Publishing and the Italian Physical Society on behalf of the European Physical Society and 17 other European physical societies. Prior to 1 January 2007 it was known as Europhysics Letters.

== Scope ==
EPL publishes original letters that communicates new results and findings that merit rapid publication in all areas of physics. EPL also publishes comments on letters previously published in the journal.

== History ==
Europhysics Letters was founded in 1986 by the European Physical Society (EPS), Société Française de Physique (SFP) and its subsidiary EDP Sciences, the Società Italiana di Fisica (SIF) and the Institute of Physics (IOP). The new journal incorporated Lettere al Nuovo Cimento and Journal de Physique: Lettres and was published by EPS, EDP Sciences and SIF until 2006.

EPL is now published under the scientific policy and control of the EPS by EDP Sciences, IOP Publishing and SIF for a partnership of 17 European physical societies (the EPL Association).

== Abstracting, indexing, and impact factor ==
According to the Journal Citation Reports, the journal had a 2023 impact factor of 1.8.

It is indexed in the following bibliographic databases:

- Aerospace & High Technology
- Chemical Abstracts
- Environmental Science and Pollution Management
- GeoRef
- INIS
- Inspec
- Astrophysics Data System
- Scopus
- SPIRES
- Web of Science
