= Izvestiya: Mathematics =

- Discipline: Interdisciplinary
- Language: English
- Edited by: V V Kozlov

Publication details
- Former names: Izvestiya Rossiiskoi Akademii Nauk, Seriya Matematicheskaya; Izvestiya Akademii Nauk SSSR, Seriya Matematicheskaya
- History: 1937
- Publisher: Turpion, London Mathematical Society, Russian Academy of Sciences
- Frequency: 6
- Impact factor: 1.189 (2020)

Standard abbreviations
- ISO 4: Izv. Math.

Indexing
- ISSN: 1064-5632 (print); 1468-4810 (web)

Links
- Journal homepage

Izvestiya: Mathematics is the English translation of the Russian mathematical journal Izvestiya Rossiiskoi Akademii Nauk, Seriya Matematicheskaya (Russian: Известия РАН. Серия математическая), formerly Izvestiya Akademii Nauk SSSR, Seriya Matematicheskaya, which was founded in 1937. Since 1995, the journal has been published jointly by Turpion, the Russian Academy of Sciences, and the London Mathematical Society.

The journal covers all fields of mathematics but pays special attention to: algebra, algebraic geometry, mathematical logic, number theory, mathematical analysis, geometry, topology, and differential equations.

Since 2008 electronic access to the content back to the first English translation volume has been hosted by IOP Publishing.

The Editor in Chief is V. V. Kozlov, Steklov Institute of Mathematics, Russian Academy of Sciences, Moscow, Russia.

== Indexing and abstracting ==
The journal is indexed in the following bibliographic databases:

- Web of Science (SCI-E)
- MathSciNet
- Scopus
- NASA Astrophysical Data System
- INIS
- Russian Science Citation Index
