= The Planetary Science Journal =

- Discipline: Planetary science, astronomy, astrophysics
- Language: English
- Edited by: Brian Jackson

Publication details
- History: 2020–present
- Publisher: IOP Publishing on behalf of the American Astronomical Society
- Frequency: Monthly
- Open access: Yes
- License: CC-BY 4.0
- Impact factor: 3.9 (2025)

Standard abbreviations
- ISO 4: Planet. Sci. J.

Indexing
- ISSN: 2632-3338
- OCLC no.: 1153999522

Links
- Journal homepage; Journal page at society website

The Planetary Science Journal is a peer-reviewed open access scientific journal of astrophysics and astronomy, established in 2020. It is published by IOP Publishing on behalf of the American Astronomical Society. The founding editor-in-chief is Faith Vilas (Planetary Science Institute)

== Abstracting and indexing ==
The journal is abstracted and indexed in Inspec and Scopus.
