= Physica Scripta =

- Discipline: Physics
- Language: English

Publication details
- History: 1970-present
- Publisher: IOP Publishing (United Kingdom)
- Frequency: Monthly
- Impact factor: 2.6 (2025)

Standard abbreviations
- ISO 4: Phys. Scr.

Indexing
- ISSN: 1402-4896 (print); 1402-4896 (web)

Links
- Journal homepage

Physica Scripta is an international scientific journal for experimental and theoretical physics. It was established in 1970 as the successor of Arkiv för Fysik and published by the Royal Swedish Academy of Sciences (KVA). Since 2006, it has been published by IOP Publishing with the endorsement of the KVA. The journal covers both experimental and theoretical physics, with an accent on atomic, molecular and optical physics, plasma physics, condensed matter physics and mathematical physics.

== Abstracting, indexing, and impact factor ==
According to the Journal Citation Reports, the journal has a 2025 impact factor of 2.6.

It is indexed in the following bibliographic databases:

- Chemical Abstracts
- Science Citation Index Expanded
- Compendex
- GeoRef
- Inspec
- Scopus
- Zentralblatt MATH
