= Journal of Optics (IOP Publishing journal) =

- Discipline: Optics, photonics
- Language: English
- Edited by: Andrew Forbes

Publication details
- Former names: Revue Générale d'Optique et de Méchanique de Précision, Revue d'Optique, Nouvelle Revue d'Optique Appliquée
- History: 1912-present
- Publisher: IOP Publishing
- Frequency: Monthly
- Impact factor: 2.6 (2025)

Standard abbreviations
- ISO 4: J. Opt.

Indexing
- ISSN: 2040-8978 (print); 2040-8986 (web)
- LCCN: 2010238158
- OCLC no.: 506264207

Links
- Journal homepage; Journal of Optics A; Journal of Optics B

The Journal of Optics is a peer-reviewed scientific journal covering all aspects of modern and classical optics, experimental and theoretical studies, applications and instrumentation. It is the official journal of the European Optical Society and is published by IOP Publishing. The editor-in-chief is Andrew Forbes (University of the Witwatersrand). According to the Journal Citation Reports, the journal has a 2025 impact factor of 2.6.

== History ==
The journal was established in 1912 as the Revue Générale d'Optique et de Mécanique de Précision. Publication was suspended during the First World War and only resumed in 1921, when the name was shortened to Revue d'Optique. Due to the Second World War, publication was again suspended in 1944, but resumed in 1947. After another suspension in 1968, the journal re-appeared in 1970 as the Nouvelle Revue d'Optique Appliquée. In 1977 it was renamed Journal of Optics. In 1998 it merged with the European Optical Society's Pure and Applied Optics and was renamed Journal of Optics A: Pure and Applied Optics. As part of the merger, the other publication of the European Optical Society, Quantum and Semiclassical Optics, was renamed Journal of Optics B: Quantum and Semiclassical Optics.

In 2006, Journal of Optics B was merged into Journal of Physics B: Atomic, Molecular and Optical Physics. Journal of Optics A was renamed Journal of Optics in January 2010, as it is now the only journal continuing the Journal of Optics series.

== Abstracting and indexing ==
The journal is abstracted and indexed in:

- Environmental Engineering Abstracts
- Bioengineering Abstracts
- Inspec
- Chemical Abstracts
- Engineering Index/Compendex
- Science Citation Index
- Current Contents/Physical, Chemical and Earth Sciences
- Current Contents/Engineering, Computing and Technology
- PASCAL Database
- Aerospace Database
