= Laser Physics (journal) =

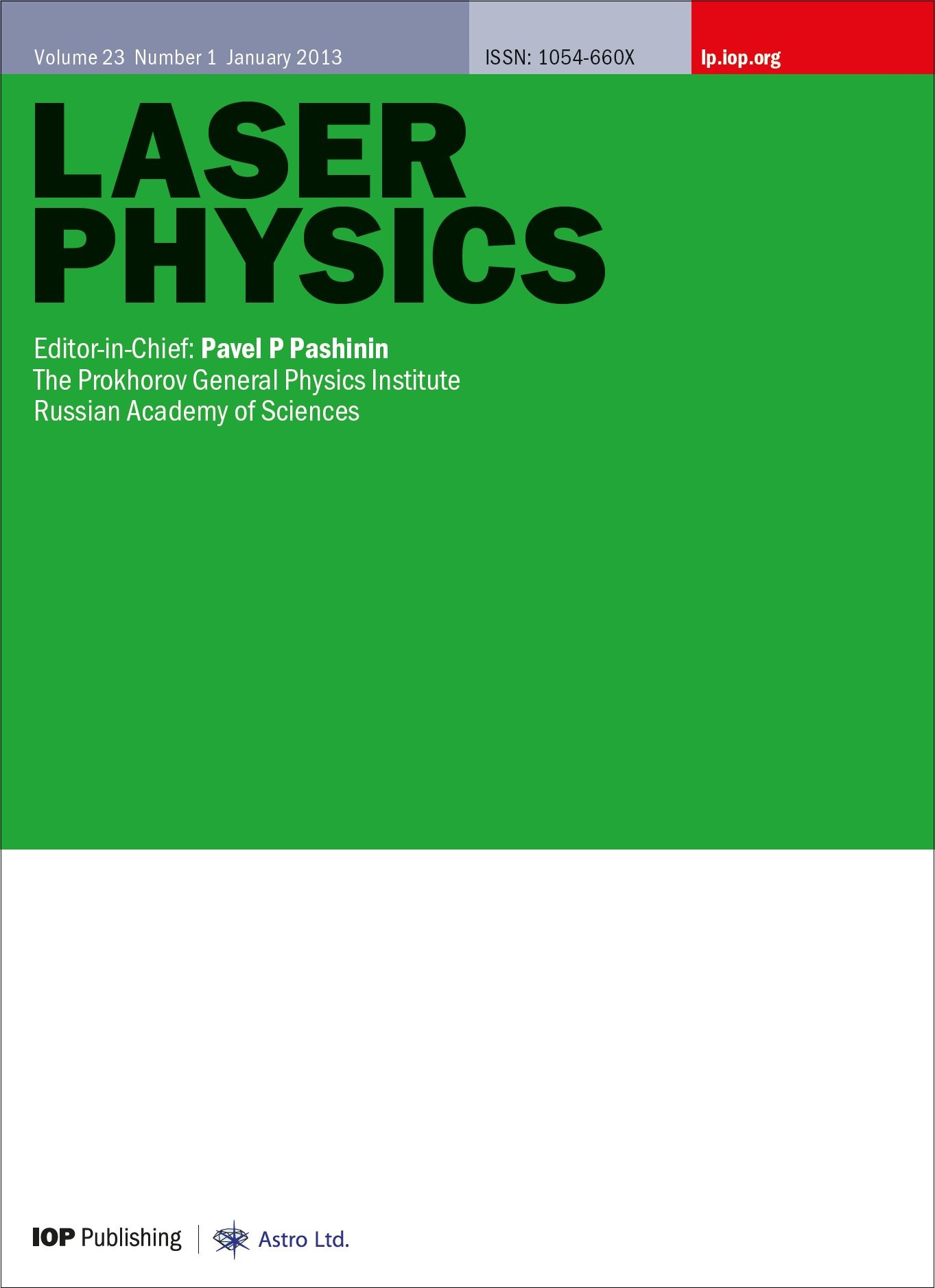
- Discipline: Laser physics
- Language: English
- Edited by: Vanderlei S. Bagnato

Publication details
- History: 1990–present
- Publisher: IOP Publishing on behalf of Astro Ltd
- Frequency: Monthly
- Impact factor: 1.1 (2025)

Standard abbreviations
- ISO 4: Laser Phys.

Indexing
- CODEN: LAPHEJ
- ISSN: 1054-660X (print); 1555-6611 (web)
- OCLC no.: 22937678

Links
- Journal homepage; Journal page at publisher's website

Laser Physics is a monthly peer-reviewed scientific journal covering research on the physics and technology of lasers and their applications. It is owned and editorially managed by Astro Ltd. and published on their behalf by IOP Publishing. The journal was established in 1990 with Alexander M. Prokhorov as founding editor-in-chief until 2002. The current editor-in-chief is Vanderlei S. Bagnato. It is a sister journal to Laser Physics Letters.

== Abstracting and indexing ==
The journal is abstracted and indexed in:

- Science Citation Index Expanded
- Current Contents
- Scopus
- INSPEC

== History ==
The journal was published by MAIK Nauka/Interperiodica from 1991 to 2005, by Springer Science+Business Media from 2006 to 2012, and since then by IOP Publishing. Its sister journal, Laser Physics Letters, was established in 2004.

== Laser Physics Letters ==
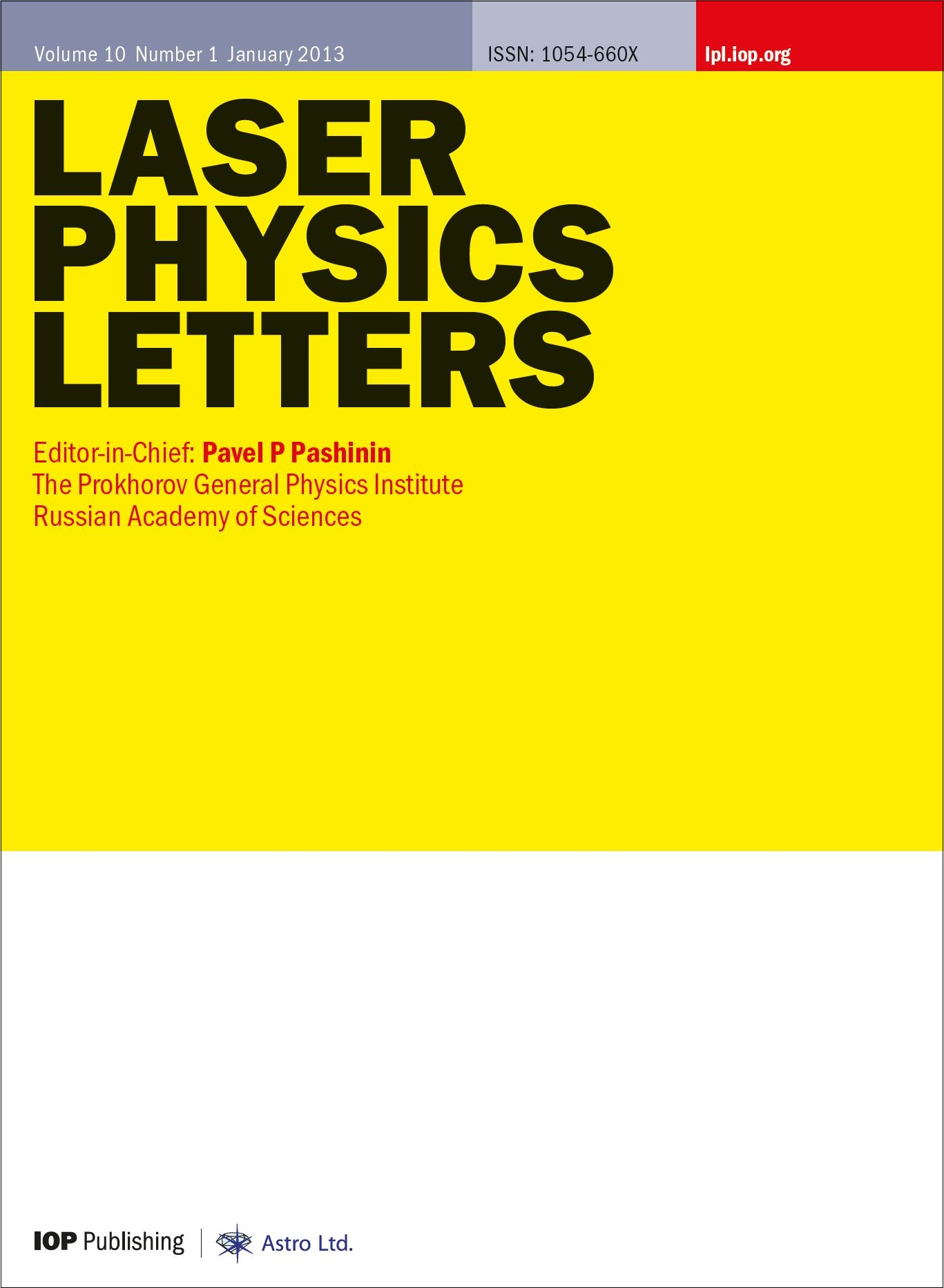

Laser Physics Letters is a sister journal that publishes short, rapid communications in fundamental optics and laser physics, and the application of lasers across interrelated sciences. The journal was established in 2004 with Pavel P. Pashinin as the founder editor-in-chief. Current editor-in-chief is Vanderlei S. Bagnato.

== See also ==
- Laser
