= Fluid Dynamics Research =

- Discipline: Fluid Mechanics
- Language: English
- Edited by: Genta Kawahara

Publication details
- History: 1986–present
- Publisher: IOP Publishing on behalf of the Japan Society of Fluid Mechanics (Japan)
- Frequency: Bimonthly
- Open access: no
- Impact factor: 1.3 (2023)

Standard abbreviations
- ISO 4: Fluid Dyn. Res.

Indexing
- CODEN: FDRSEH
- ISSN: 0169-5983 (print); 1873-7005 (web)
- LCCN: sn87012756
- OCLC no.: 905462743

Links
- Journal homepage

Fluid Dynamics Research is a bimonthly peer-reviewed scientific journal covering all fields of fluid dynamics. Published on behalf of the Japan Society of Fluid Mechanics, from 1986 to 2008 it was published by Elsevier and since 2009 it has been published by IOP Publishing. The editor-in-chief is Genta Kawahara (Osaka University). According to the Journal Citation Reports, the journal has a 2023 impact factor of 1.3.

Every year, one article published in the previous year is awarded the FDR Prize, to recognize its outstanding quality.
