= Plasma Sources Science and Technology =

- Language: English
- Edited by: I Adamovich

Publication details
- History: 1992-present
- Publisher: IOP Publishing (UK)
- Frequency: 12
- Impact factor: 3.3 (2023)

Standard abbreviations
- ISO 4: Plasma Sources Sci. Technol.

Indexing
- ISSN: 0963-0252 (print); 1361-6595 (web)

Links
- Journal homepage

Plasma Sources Science and Technology is an international journal dedicated solely to non-fusion aspects of plasma science.

The journal is indexed in Scopus, INSPEC Information Services, ISI (SciSearch, ISI Alerting Services, Current Contents/Physical, Chemical and Earth Sciences), Chemical Abstracts, INIS Atomindex (International Nuclear Information System), NASA Astrophysics Data System, PASCAL Database, Article@INIST, Engineering Index/Ei Compendex, Cambridge Scientific Abstracts (Environmental Engineering Abstracts, Bioengineering Abstracts), and VINITI Abstracts Journal.

== Editors in Chief ==
Editor	Years	Institution
Prof. Noah Hershkowitz	1992 - 2007	University of Wisconsin–Madison
Prof. Mark J. Kushner	2007 - 2013	Michigan Institute for Plasma Science and Engineering, University of Michigan
Prof. Bill Graham	2013 - 2017	Queen's University Belfast
Prof. Uwe Czarnetzki	2017 - Present	Ruhr University Bochum
