= Journal of Optics (India) =

- Discipline: Optics
- Language: English
- Edited by: Lakshminarayan Hazra

Publication details
- History: 1972–present
- Publisher: Springer
- Frequency: Quarterly
- Impact factor: 2.4 (2024)

Standard abbreviations
- ISO 4: J. Opt. (India)

Indexing
- ISSN: 0972-8821 (print); 0974-6900 (web)

Links
- Journal homepage; Online access; Online archive

Journal of Optics is a peer-reviewed scientific journal published quarterly by Springer on behalf of the Optical Society of India. It covers fundamental and applied research in optics, photonics and vision science. It was established in 1972 and its editor-in-chief is Lakshminarayan Hazra (University of Calcutta).

== Abstracting and indexing ==
The journal is abstracted and indexed in:

- Emerging Sources Citation Index
- EBSCO databases
- Ei Compendex
- Inspec
- ProQuest databases
- Scopus

According to the Journal Citation Reports, the journal has a 2024 impact factor of 2.4.
