= Russian Chemical Reviews =

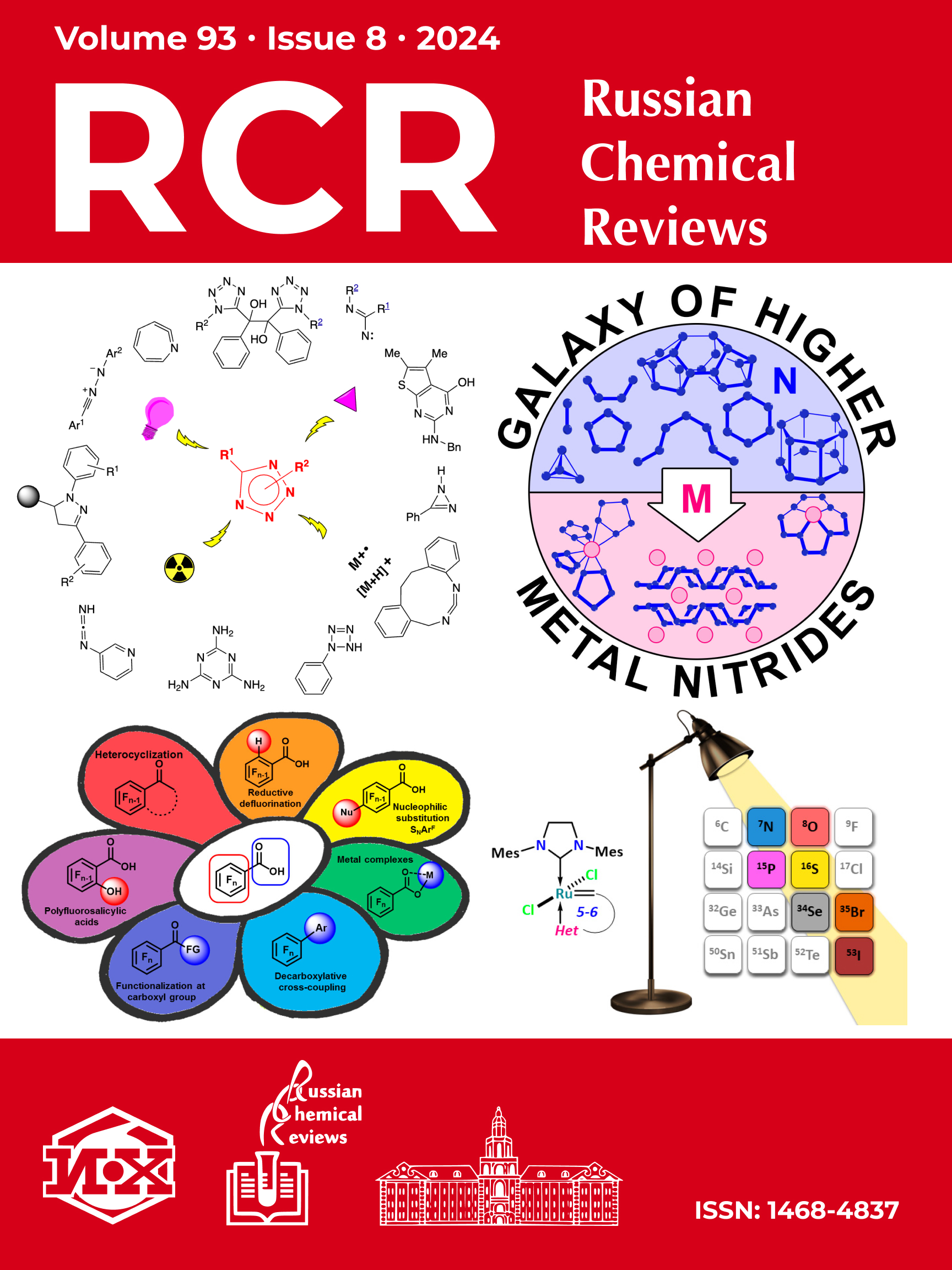
- Discipline: Chemistry
- Language: English
- Edited by: Mikhail P Egorov

Publication details
- History: 1960-present
- Publisher: ANO Editorial Board of the journal Uspekhi Khimii (Russia)
- Frequency: Monthly
- Open access: Diamond
- Impact factor: 7.0 (2023)

Standard abbreviations
- ISO 4: Russ. Chem. Rev.

Indexing
- ISSN: 0036-021X (print); 1468-4837 (web)
- OCLC no.: 37632471

Links
- Journal homepage; Online access

The Russian Chemical Reviews journal was founded in 1932 and is currently published by the N. D. Zelinsky Institute of Organic Chemistry of the Russian Academy of Sciences. The journal publishes high-quality authoritative and critical reviews on topical issues of modern chemistry and related sciences

According to the Journal Citation Reports, the journal has a 2023 impact factor of 7.0.

In 2022, the journal moved to an open access publishing model. It has since become a diamond open access journal, with no charges to readers or authors.
