= Journal of Physics G =

Journal of Physics G: Nuclear and Particle Physics
- Discipline: Nuclear physics, particle physics
- Language: English
- Edited by: Jacek Dobaczewski

Publication details
- History: 1989–present: Journal of Physics G: Nuclear and Particle Physics; 1975-1988: Journal of Physics G: Nuclear Physics
- Publisher: IOP Publishing
- Frequency: Monthly
- Open access: Hybrid
- Impact factor: 3.1 (2025)

Standard abbreviations
- ISO 4: J. Phys. G

Indexing
- CODEN: JPGPED
- ISSN: 0954-3899 (print); 1361-6471 (web)

Links
- Journal homepage

Journal of Physics G: Nuclear and Particle Physics is a peer-reviewed journal that publishes theoretical and experimental research into nuclear physics, particle physics and particle astrophysics, including all interface areas between these fields.

The editor-in-chief is Jacek Dobaczewski, University of York, England.

== Scope ==
The journal publishes research articles on:

- theoretical and experimental topics in the physics of elementary particles and fields;
- intermediate-energy physics and nuclear physics;
- experimental and theoretical research in particle, neutrino, and nuclear astrophysics;
- research arising from all interface areas among these fields.

Research is published in the following formats:

- Research Papers: Reports of original and high-quality research work;
- Research Notes: Contributions from individuals (or small groups) within large collaborations, containing early results of analyses, detector development, simulations, etc. which might not otherwise be published in the wider literature;
- Topical Reviews: Specially commissioned review articles on areas of current interest;
- LabTalk: Article summaries written by the researchers themselves which introduce the findings, techniques, and possible applications of their research.

== Abstracting and indexing information ==
The journal is indexed in INSPEC Information Services, ISI (Science Citation Index, SciSearch, ISI Alerting Services, Current Contents/Physical, Chemical and Earth Sciences), Article@INIST, and Chemical Abstracts.
