= Nuclear Fusion (journal) =

- Discipline: Nuclear fusion
- Language: English
- Edited by: Francesco Romanelli

Publication details
- History: 1960–present
- Publisher: IOP Publishing (UK) co-published with IAEA (Vienna, Austria)
- Frequency: Monthly
- Impact factor: 3.5 (2023)

Standard abbreviations
- ISO 4: Nucl. Fusion

Indexing
- ISSN: 0029-5515

Links
- Journal homepage

Nuclear Fusion is a peer-reviewed international scientific journal that publishes articles, letters and review articles, special issue articles, conferences summaries and book reviews on the theoretical and practical research based on controlled thermonuclear fusion. The journal was first published in September, 1960 by IAEA and its head office was housed at the headquarter of IAEA in Vienna, Austria. Since 2002, the journal has been jointly published by IAEA and IOP Publishing.

== The Nuclear Fusion Award ==
Since 2006, this award has been given each year to a particular paper of highest standard. The editorial board selects the recipient from all the research papers published in the Nuclear Fusion journal two years prior to the award year. The list of recipients are -

- Tim Luce (2006)
- Clemente Angioni, Max Planck Institute for Plasma Physics, Germany (2007)
- Todd Evans (2008)
- Steve Sabbagh, Columbia University, USA (2009)
- John Rice, Massachusetts Institute of Technology (2010)
- Hajime Urano, JAEA, Japan (2011)
- Pat Diamond, University of California at San Diego (2012)
- Dennis Whyte, Massachusetts Institute of Technology, USA (2013)
- Phil Snyder, General Atomics, USA (2014)
- Robert Goldston, Princeton Plasma Physics Laboratory, USA (2015)
- Sebastijan Brezinsek, EUROfusion Consortium and Forschungszentrum Jülich, Germany (2016)
- Francois Ryter, Max Planck Institute for Plasma Physics, Germany (2017)
- A. Kallenbach, Max Planck Institute for Plasma Physics, Germany (2018)
- N.T. Howard, Massachusetts Institute of Technology, USA (2019)
- C. Theiler, Swiss Plasma Center, Switzerland (2020)
