= Superconductor Science and Technology =

- Discipline: Superconductivity
- Language: English
- Edited by: Cathy. P. Foley

Publication details
- History: 1988-present
- Publisher: IOP Publishing (United Kingdom)
- Frequency: Monthly
- Open access: Hybrid
- Impact factor: 3.4 (2025)

Standard abbreviations
- ISO 4: Supercond. Sci. Technol.

Indexing
- CODEN: SUSTEF
- ISSN: 0953-2048 (print); 1361-6668 (web)
- LCCN: 88651712
- OCLC no.: 664561486

Links
- Journal homepage

Superconductor Science and Technology is a peer-reviewed scientific journal covering research on all aspects of superconductivity, including theories on superconductivity, the basic physics of superconductors, the relation of microstructure and growth to superconducting properties, the theory of novel devices, and the fabrication and properties of thin films and devices. The editor-in-chief is Cathy P Foley (CSIRO). It was established in 1988 and it is published by IOP Publishing. According to the Journal Citation Reports, the journal has an impact factor of 3.4 for 2025.

== Article types ==
The journal publishes articles in the following categories:

- Papers: regular articles reporting original research in superconductivity and its application without formal length restrictions
- Letters: short articles reporting very substantial new advances and no longer than 5 journal pages or 4500 words including figures
- Topical reviews: review papers commissioned by the editors
