= Proceedings of the Physical Society =

Scientific journal

- Discipline: Physics
- Language: English

Publication details
- History: 1874 to 1967
- Publisher: IOP Publishing (United Kingdom)
- Frequency: Monthly

Standard abbreviations
- ISO 4: Proc. Phys. Soc.

Indexing
- Proceedings of the Physical Society of London (1874-1925)
- ISSN: 1478-7814
- Proceedings of the Physical Society (1926-1948)
- ISSN: 0959-5309
- Proceedings of the Physical Society - Section A (1949-1957)
- ISSN: 0370-1298
- Proceedings of the Physical Society - Section B (1949-1957)
- ISSN: 0370-1301
- Proceedings of the Physical Society (1958-1967)
- ISSN: 0370-1328

Links
- Journal homepage

The Proceedings of the Physical Society was a journal on the subject of physics, originally associated with the Physical Society of London, England. In 1968, it was replaced by the Journal of Physics.

== Journal history ==
- 1874–1925: Proceedings of the Physical Society of London
- 1926–1948: Proceedings of the Physical Society
- 1949–1957: Proceedings of the Physical Society, Section A
- 1949–1957: Proceedings of the Physical Society, Section B
- 1958–1967: Proceedings of the Physical Society
