= VINITI =

Scientific information institute of the Russian Academy of Sciences

Coordinates: 55.8082°N 37.5199°E

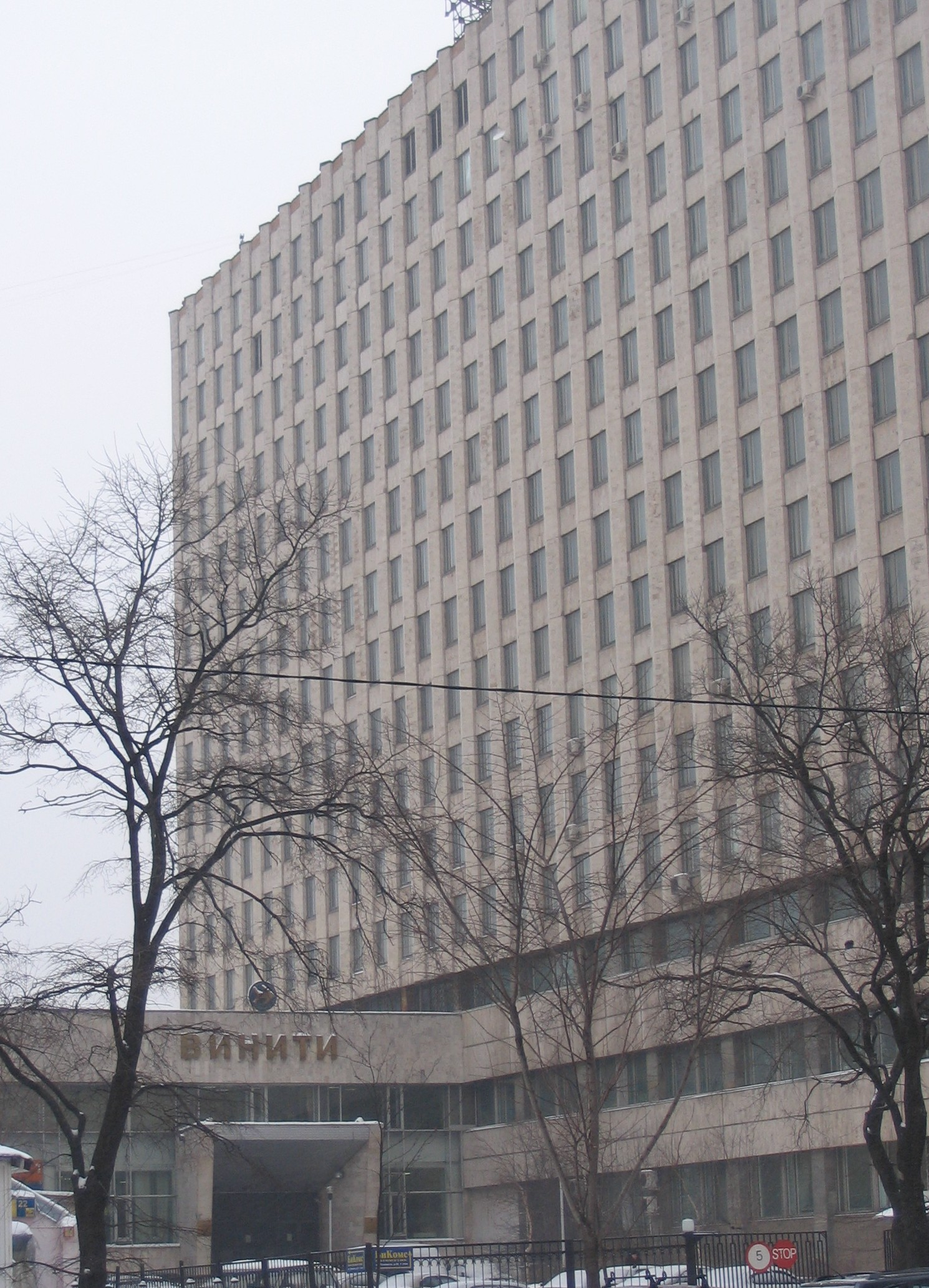
Main building

VINITI (Russian: ВИНИТИ; All-Russian Institute for Scientific and Technical Information; Russian: Всероссийский институт научной и технической информации; formerly All-Union Institute for Scientific and Technical Information) is a subsidiary of the Russian Academy of Sciences devoted to gathering scientific and technical information from sources throughout the world and disseminating this information to the Russian scientific community.

It was established in 1952 as the Institute for Scientific Information (Russian: Институт научной информации). Its founder was Alexander Nesmeyanov. Its main office is in Moscow, and its publishing house is in Lyubertsy.

The Institute publishes Referativny Zhurnal ("The Abstract Journal") and produces the VINITI Database RAS.

== Purpose ==
VINITI is the name for the Russian, and formerly Soviet, organization, All-Union Institute for Scientific and Technical Information. It was established in 1952 as a branch of the USSR Academy of Sciences. At its inception, it was tasked with gathering scientific and technical information from sources throughout the world, and to disseminate this information to the Soviet and socialist scientific community. By 1992, technical and scientific documents had been amassed from more than 100 countries, in 60 languages, available for dissemination, and the Institute had become the largest single source of secondary scientific and technical information in the world, with 31 million citations from indexed literature from 1953 to 1992. Much of the former Soviet database contained materials unique to the Eastern bloc scientific community, which was just then being made available to American, British, Western European, and Japanese scientists and researchers.

In 1952 the Presidium of the USSR Academy of Sciences made a decision to set up the Scientific Information Institute in the framework of the Academy of Sciences. The institute's main task was to organize the informational support of basic science by centralizing the collection, analysis and processing of information. The government reorganized the Institute into the formerly named All-Union Institute of Scientific and Technical Information (VINITI) in 1955.

By 2002, VINITI is the largest online data bank in Russia, with more than 25 million documents. The database contains the Abstract Journal which is distributed, subscribed to, and read by scientists in 60 countries, with more than 330 publications covering all fields of basic and applied sciences. In 2002, it was also noted for having more than 240 databases on science and technology, economics and medicine. It also has powerful retrieval systems and offers a wide range of services.

== Publications ==
VINITI has published the Abstracts Journal series (Russian: Referativny Zhurnal) since 1952. It features reviews and abstracts of published materials in various areas, including books, scientific research papers, patent documents, regulatory information, technical papers, trade publications, foreign dissertations, and cartographic publications.
