= Referativny Zhurnal =

- Series Mathematics
- Discipline: Multidisciplinary scientific
- Language: Russian

Publication details
- History: 1952–present
- Publisher: VINITI (Soviet Union)

Standard abbreviations
- ISO 4: Ref. Zh.

Links
- Journal homepage

Referativny Zhurnal (or Referativnyi Zhurnal) (Russian: "Реферати́вный журна́л", lit. Review Journal) are the first two words of the titles of over a hundred different abstracting magazines (journals). They were mostly published (mostly monthly) by VINITI (All-Russian Institute of Scientific and Technical Information of the Russian Academy of Sciences located in Moscow). During the Soviet period it was named the "All-Union Institute ... of the USSR Academy ..." which used the same acronym: VINITI. They started out with just a few titles in 1952. In 2015 there were 28 different titles with 224 issues in total each year. There are also summary volumes at the end of the year. In 2015 the fields covered by the internet versions are:

- Radio, electronics and computer technology
- Astronomy. Space science
- Biology. Biotechnology. Biophysics
- Geography. Geophysics
- Informatics
- Publishing
- Mathematics. Computer Science
- Mechanical engineering
- Metallurgy
- Mechanics
- Civil defense
- Environmental science
- Transport
- Physics
- Chemistry
- Economics and management
- Electronic technology and energetics

== Introduction ==
The Referativnyi Zhuranli = Реферативные журналы (plural) = реферативный журнал (singular)= РЖ = RZh are a set of abstracting journals the first of which were initiated in the Soviet Union in 1952. They were abstracts of mostly magazine (journal) or conference articles, but books and patents were also included as well as unpublished "deposited" articles. The articles they abstracted included 66 different languages from 130 different countries of the world. The name of each abstracting journal, (which were published once every month (some every 2 months) begins with "Referativny Zhurnal" (Реферативный журнал). For example: Referativny Zhurnal Zhezhnodoroznyi Transport = "реферативный журнал, железнодорожный транспорт" = Abstracts of Railway Transportation, consisted of 5 parts: Railroad operation; locomotive and car construction; technical operation of rolling stock and traction of trains; railway construction, track and track maintenance; automation, remote control, and signalling on railroads. One could subscribe to just one of these 5 parts separately, or subscribe to all 5 parts bound together as a "сводный том" = "combined volume". there are over 24 different "combined volumes" plus 41 more titles consisting of only one part (not combined into a combined volume) with a total of 235 parts altogether, issued monthly (or bi-monthly). The meaning of the term "Referativny Zhurnal" may mean abstracting journals in general, including pre-Soviet and non-Russian ones. (see Great Soviet Encyclopedia ) and not just the ones created by VINITI.

Today in the 2010s most access to this information is via CD or the Internet (paid access) and the print copies are not used much anymore and are very expensive. The electronic database is known as VINITI Database RAS. Starting in 2005, VINITI offers an electronic version of the Referativny Zhurnal. Back issues are also available on CD, going back to 1997.

== Circulation and Content Declines after the Soviet Collapse ==
Until the 1980s the RZh (РЖ) project was well funded but as the 1980s progressed (prior to the collapse of the Soviet Union in 1991) the situation started to deteriorate and some articles that should have been abstracted were not due to lack of staff (and money to hire them). After the collapse of the Soviet Union the subscription prices rapidly increased, along with a decrease in subscriptions. For example, the "Physics" issue (РЖ «Физика») went from 1300 subscribers at the end of the 1980s to 30-40 subscribers in 2010. This situation was typical for other titles as well. During this interval, the number of articles abstracted fell from 1.4 million per year to .75 million. Considering that the number of articles published worldwide per year in 2010 is alleged to be roughly twice the number for the late 1980s it implies over a 4-fold decrease in the coverage of articles by the RZh (РЖ) However it was also available on CD and online. A survey in Siberia in 2010 found about 25% preferred the printed version to the electronic ones, while 15% were neutral (60% favored electronic). In Siberia, the use of the electronic data base decreased by almost 50% between 2007-9 and 2011-2.

== Similar publications in the West ==
The Referativny Zhurnal, notably the Mathematics series, was created as a Soviet counterpart to Western scientific publications, such as:

- Mathematical Reviews
- Zentralblatt MATH

== See also ==
- CSA (database company)
- Inspec
- Web of Science
- VINITI Database RAS
- VINITI
- Universal Decimal Classification (UDC)
