= Materials Science Citation Index =

Citation index established by Thomson ISI (Thomson Reuters) in 1992

The Materials Science Citation Index is a citation index, established in 1992, by Thomson ISI (Thomson Reuters). Its overall focus is cited reference searching of the notable and significant journal literature in materials science. The database makes accessible the various properties, behaviors, and materials in the materials science discipline. This then encompasses applied physics, ceramics, composite materials, metals and metallurgy, polymer engineering, semiconductors, thin films, biomaterials, dental technology, as well as optics. The database indexes relevant materials science information from over 6,000 scientific journals that are part of the ISI database which is multidisciplinary. Author abstracts are searchable, which links articles sharing one or more bibliographic references. The database also allows a researcher to use an appropriate (or related to research) article as a base to search forward in time to discover more recently published articles that cite it.

Materials Science Citation Index lists 625 high-impact journals, and is accessible via the Science Citation Index Expanded collection of databases.

== Editions ==
Coverage of Materials science is accomplished with the following editions:

- Materials Science, Ceramics
- Materials Science, Characterization & Testing
- Materials Science, Biomaterials
- Materials Science, Coatings & Films
- Materials Science, Composites
- Materials Science, Paper & Wood
- Materials Science, Multidisciplinary
- Materials Science, Textiles

== See also ==
- Science Citation Index
- Academic publishing
- List of academic databases and search engines
- Social Sciences Citation Index, which covers over 1500 journals, beginning with 1956
- Arts and Humanities Citation Index, which covers over 1000 journals, beginning with 1975
- Impact factor
- VINITI Database RAS
