= PASCAL (database) =

Bibliographic database

- Producer: INIST (France)
- Languages: French, English, Spanish

Access
- Providers: Datastar, Dialog, Ovid Technologies, Questel.Orbit, QWAM System, STN International
- Cost: Subscription

Coverage
- Disciplines: Science, technology, medicine
- Record depth: Index & abstract
- Format coverage: Journal articles (88%); conference proceedings (9%); dissertations, books, patents, reports (3%)
- Temporal coverage: 1973-present
- Geospatial coverage: Worldwide, with emphasis on France and Europe
- No. of records: > 17,000,000
- Update frequency: Weekly

Links
- Website: www.inist.fr?PASCAL-73&lang=en

PASCAL is a scientific bibliographic database, which is maintained by INIST (CNRS). PASCAL covers the core scientific literature in science, technology and medicine with a special emphasis on European literature.

As of 2012, PASCAL maintains a database of more than 17 million records, 90% of which are author abstracts. Its coverage is from 1973 to present. Its source documents are composed of journal articles at 88% (3,085 international titles), proceedings at 9%, and dissertations, books, patents, and reports account combined for 3%.
