= VINITI Database RAS =

Database of scientific publications

VINITI Database RAS is a database provided by the All-Russian Institute for Scientific and Technical Information (VINITI). The database is devoted to scientific publications. It is described as a large abstracting database. In general, it is indexed for the natural sciences, exact sciences, and technical sciences. Included in this database is AJ (Abstract Journal), indexed from 1981 to the present day.

The database is made up of published materials encompassing, conference proceedings, trade publications, thesis, periodicals, books, patents, regulatory documents, and collected scientific literature. Russian sources make up 30% of the deposited scientific works. The database produces documents that have a bibliographal description, keywords, a heading and an abstract. Primary source abstracts are mostly in Russian.

Another organizational structure of the VINITI database is its divisions into 29 thematic fragments. Also, there are over 230 editions of this database. A single Polythematic database was added in 2001, which is able to combine all the thematic fragments, except for "Mathematics". In addition, the thematic fragment, "Chemistry", is updated two times per month.

== Scientific literature deposited at VINITI ==
The following is a sample of the scientific literature that is deposited at the All-Union Institute of Scientific and Technical Information (VINITI).

=== Peer reviewed journals ===
- Materials Science, Springer New York. Materials Science is a translation of the peer-reviewed Ukrainian journal Fizyko-Khimichna Mekhanika Materialiv.
- Russian Journal of Physical Chemistry A ( (Zhurnal fizicheskoi khimii). MAIK Nauka/Interperiodica (publisher). 2010. It was established in 1930.

== Separate editions of VINITI ==
The separate editions of this database are respectively entitled: "Scientific and scientific-technical journals and collections", "Overview", "Express Info", "Abstract collections", "Information Collections", "Newsletters".

=== Scientific and scientific-technical journals and collections ===
The following issues are published in Scientific and scientific-technical journals and collections:

- Problems safety
- Integrated Logistics
- Chemical and Biological Safety
- Membranes. A series of "Critical Technology"
- International Forum on Information
- Scientific and technical information. Series 1. "Organization and methods of work"
- Scientific and technical information. Series 2. "Information Processes and Systems"

=== Overview ===
Overview is a periodical published 12 times per annum. It is a depository for one or several survey papers in a particular field of science and technology. Analytical content and synthesis of data is included in this collection. Survey information produced by VINITI RAS is in the following publications:

- Scientific and technical aspects of environmental protection
- Problems of the Environment and Natural Resources
- Environmental Assessment
- Environmental Economics
- Contemporary Mathematics and Its Applications
- Thematic reviews

=== Express Info ===
Express information is a periodical publication which is made up of detailed abstracts of what is considered to be significant scientific and technical documents. This published in Russia and abroad. Express information publishes the following issues:

- Testing and measuring technology
- Saving technologies
- Legal issues of environmental protection
- Packaging. Containers
- Management, Logistics and Informatics in Transport

=== Abstract collections ===
Abstract collections is a periodic, abstracting service for domestic and foreign, scientific and technical, literature. This includes abstracts for books, dissertations, patent documents, analysis, overview, and deposited scientific works published in the Abstract Journal of VINITI RAS. Abstract collections publishes the following issues:

- Energy Savings
- Clinical Endocrinology
- Radiodiagnosis
- Medical work
- Psychiatry

=== Information Collections ===
Information Collections is also a periodical which publishes detailed abstracts, and analysis on foreign documents. The foreign works are characterized as scientific, technical, legal and economics literature, focused and related to a defined area of science and technology. Information Collections publishes the following issues:

- The safety and emergencies
- Transportation: science, technology, management
- Federal and regional programs Russia
- Economics of Contemporary Russia
- Cardiovascular Surgery
- News of Anesthesiology and Intensive Care
- Emergency Medicine. Office of Disaster Medicine

=== Newsletters ===
Newsletters publishes the following issues:

- Bulletin of the international scientific congresses, conferences, congresses, exhibitions
- The foreign press about the economic, scientific-technical and military potential of the CIS member states and the technical means to detect. Series: 1, 2, 3.
- Economics and Management in Foreign Countries
- Crime abroad

=== Deposited scientific works ===
This separate edition contains the "Bibliographic Index". The bibliographic index contains bibliographic descriptions of scientific papers, deposited at VINITI RAS and industry centers.

== Thematic fragments ==
The 29 thematic fragments, mentioned above, are broad subject fields (categories) such as the following:

- Automation and electronics AB 1981
- Astronomy AU 1989
- Biology BI 1981
- Computational Science
- Engineering MN 1981
- Medicine MD 1998
- Metallurgy MT 1981
- Physics FI 1983

=== Subcategories ===
These broad subject fields are each further divided into subfields. For example, Astronomy (Au) encompasses:

- AS01 Astronomy (51)

Retrospective from 1989
This subfield includes ordinary inquiries involving astronomy. Moreover, this subfield includes theoretical aspects of astronomy and celestial mechanics. Methods of astronomical observations, along with observatories, instruments, and devices are categorized here. This subfield also indexes documents related to the following: Sun, Solar System, Star, Nebulae, Interstellar medium, and Cosmology. Also: Astrometry and Astron.

- AS03 Study of Earth from space (73)

Retrospective from 1989
This subfield includes general issues in Earth observation such as the physical, geometric, geodynamic framework of Earth from space, along with methods and tools for studies of Earth from space. Documents from research programs and papers concerning their objectives are indexed in this subfield. Papers pertaining to the space systems of earth, and documents which place space information under the purview of the Earth Sciences and economic sectors are available in this subfield. Economics and cost-effectiveness studies of the Earth from space are part of this subfield.

- AS02 Surveying and aerial photography (52)

Retrospective from 1989
This subfield includes ordinary inquiries involving Geodesy and Cartography. Moreover, this subfield includes theoretical studies of Geodesy. The subfield also indexes the following: Geodetic Astronomy, Space geodesy, Gravimetry, and geodetic methods for solving geodynamic problems. The results of geodetic measurements are given mathematical interpretations. Surveying Instruments, and their study are also included.

This subfield also includes documents about studying and mapping the Moon's size, shape, surface topography, and its gravitational and magnetic fields. In other words, determining by observation and measurement, the exact positions of points and the figures and areas of large portions of the Moon's surface, or the shape and size of the Moon, i.e., "Selenodesy". These methods are applied to other planets as well.

- AS04 Space exploration (62)

Retrospective from 1989
This subfield includes ordinary inquiries involving space exploration.

== See also ==
- Universal Decimal Classification (UDC)
