= International Nuclear Information System =

IAEA collection of technical information

The International Nuclear Information System (INIS) hosts one of the world's largest collections of published information on the peaceful uses of nuclear science and technology.

== History ==
One of the founding purposes of the International Atomic Energy Agency is "to foster the exchange of scientific and technical information on the peaceful uses of atomic energy." Concurrently, the publication Nuclear Science Abstracts was produced by the United States Atomic Energy Commission at Oak Ridge, Tennessee beginning in 1948. Nuclear Science Abstracts sought to fully cover the world's nuclear science literature. By 1968, it had partnerships with 316 institutions in 44 countries The director of NSA, Edward J. Brunenkant, realized that the further development and expansion of NSA would not be possible without the backing of an international organization. At the third U.N. Conference on the Peaceful Uses of Atomic Energy in 1964, Bunenkant proposed that the effort be undertaken by the IAEA. In 1966, consultants from the Soviet Union and United States (Lev. L. Issaev, and Raymond K. Wakerling, respectively) met in Vienna to explore the possibilities, and to develop parameters of the programme that would be acceptable to both countries. The consultants produced a set of recommendations, and in December of that year, the IAEA convened a working group of 16 countries and 3 international organization to agree on the final parameters of the programme.

== System configuration ==
The system receives bibliographic references and full-text reports from member states and organizations represented by INIS Liaison Officers in each of those entities. The IAEA supplements these contributions by acquiring bibliographic references from publishers and repositories in its scope. In its first year of operation, some 3,944 bibliographic references were provided, 644 also containing a full-text non-conventional literature, also called grey literature. By the end of 2022, the system had grown to 4,654,908 bibliographic references, with 431,670 of those full-text.

In the first years of publication, INIS was provided in book form and microfiche. Now all records are available on the website INIS Repository Search.

INIS is based in Vienna, Austria and has been operating since 1970. INIS is operated by the International Atomic Energy Agency in collaboration with 132 Member States and 17 co-operating international organizations. All the content it holds is currently available free to "all Internet users around the world".

== See also ==
- International Nuclear Event Scale (INES)
- List of academic databases and search engines
