= Astrophysics Data System =

Digital library portal operated by the Smithsonian

SAO/NASA Astrophysics Data System
- Producer: Smithsonian Astrophysical Observatory for the National Aeronautics and Space Administration (United States)
- History: 1992 to present

Access
- Cost: Free

Coverage
- Disciplines: Astronomy and physics
- Record depth: Index & abstract & full-text
- Geospatial coverage: Worldwide

Links
- Website: scixplorer.org ui.adsabs.harvard.edu

The SAO/NASA Astrophysics Data System (ADS) is a digital library portal for researchers on astronomy and physics, operated for NASA by the Smithsonian Astrophysical Observatory. ADS maintains three bibliographic collections containing over 15 million records, including all arXiv e-prints. Abstracts and full-text of major astronomy and physics publications are indexed and searchable through the portal.

A rebrand to Science Explorer (SciX) began in September 2025 and was completed in November 2026. SciX has a broader focus, indexing scientific literature on topics beyond astrophysics.

== Historical context ==
Johann Friedrich Weidler published the first comprehensive history of astronomy in 1741 and the first astronomical bibliography in 1755. This was an effort to archive and classify earlier astronomical knowledge and works.

This effort was continued by Jérôme de La Lande who published his Bibliographie astronomique in 1803, a work that covered the period from 480 BCE to the year of publication.

The Bibliographie générale de l’astronomie, Volume I and Volume II, published by J.C. Houzeau and A. Lancaster, followed in 1882 until 1889.

As the number of astronomers and astronomical publications grew, bibliographical efforts became institutional tasks, first at the Observatoire Royal de Belgique, where the Bibliography of Astronomy was published from 1881 to 1898, and then at the Astronomischer Rechen-Institut in Heidelberg, where the yearly Astronomischer Jahresbericht was published from 1899 to 1968. After 1968, this was replaced by the yearly Astronomy and Astrophysics Abstracts book series, which continued until the end of the 20th century.

== History ==
The first suggestion of a digital database of journal paper abstracts was made at a conference on Astronomy from Large Data-Bases held in Garching bei München in 1987.

An initial version of ADS, with a database consisting of 40 papers, was created as a proof of concept in 1988. The ADS Abstract Service became available for general use via proprietary network software in April 1993, and it was connected to SIMBAD a few months later. In early 1994 the ADS web-based service was launched, which effectively quadrupled the number of active users in the five weeks following its introduction.

In 2011 the ADS launched ADS Labs Streamlined Search which introduced facets for query refinement and selection. In 2013, ADS Labs 2.0 started featuring a new search engine, full-text search functionality, scalable facets, and an API was introduced. In 2015, the new ADS, code-named Bumblebee, was released as ADS-beta. The ADS-beta system features a micro-services API and client-side dynamic page loading served on a cloud platform. In May 2018 the beta label was dropped and Bumblebee became the default ADS interface—with some legacy features (ADS Classic) remaining available. ADS Classic was retired on 31 October 2019; its search forms were redirected to the new interface, while the full-text article archive stayed online. Development continues to the present day, with an extensible API available: enabling users to build their own utilities on top of the ADS bibliographic record. ADS users were scheduled to move to the astrophysics version of SciX on 16 November 2026.

As of 2000, the ADS service was distributed worldwide with seven mirror sites on four continents, with the database synchronized by weekly updates using rsync, a mirroring utility which allows updates to only the portions of the database which have changed. Updates were triggered centrally, but they initiated scripts at the mirror sites which "pulled" updated data from the main ADS servers.

== Data in the system ==
At first, the journal articles available via ADS were exclusively scanned bitmaps created from the paper journals and the abstracts created using optical character recognition software. Some of these scanned articles up to around 1995 are available for free by agreement with the journal publishers, with some dating from as far back as the early 19th century. Eventually, because of a wider spread of online editions of journal publications, abstracts would start to instead be loaded into ADS directly.

Papers are indexed within the database by their bibliographic record which contains the details of the journal they were published in, and various associated metadata, such as author lists, references and citations. Originally this data was stored in ASCII format but eventually the limitations of this encouraged the database maintainers to migrate all records to an XML (Extensible Markup Language) format in 2000. Bibliographic records are now stored as an XML element with sub-elements for the various metadata.

Scanned articles are stored in TIFF format at both medium and high resolution. The TIFF files are converted on demand into GIF files, for on-screen viewing, and PDF or PostScript files for printing. The generated files are then cached to eliminate needlessly frequent regenerations for popular articles. As of 2000, ADS contained 250 GB of scans, which consisted of 1,128,955 article pages comprising 138,789 articles. By 2005 this had grown to 650 GB and was expected to grow further to about 900 GB by 2007. By 2024, ADS estimated its collection of historic astronomy literature at over 80% complete. Much of it came from observatory publications that librarians at the Center for Astrophysics' John G. Wolbach Library and the United States Naval Observatory's James M. Gillis Library scanned onto 35 mm film, which ADS then digitized.

The database initially contained only astronomical references, but has now grown to incorporate three databases, covering astronomy references (including planetary sciences and solar physics), physics references (including instrumentation and geosciences), as well as preprints of scientific papers from arXiv. The astronomy database is by far the most advanced and its use accounts for about 85% of the total ADS usage. Articles are assigned to the different databases according to the subject rather than the journal they are published in, so that articles from any one journal might appear in all three subject databases. The separation of the databases allows searching in each discipline to be tailored, so that words can automatically be given different weight functions in different database searches, depending on how common they are in the relevant field.

Data in the preprint archive is updated daily from arXiv which is the dominant repository of physics and astronomy preprints. The advent of preprint servers has, like ADS, had a significant impact on the rate of astronomical research, as papers are often made available from preprint servers weeks or months before they are published in the journals. The incorporation of preprints from arXiv into ADS means that the search engine can return the most current research available, with the caveat that preprints may not have been peer-reviewed or proofread to the required standard for publication in the main journals. The database of ADS links preprints with subsequently published articles wherever possible, so that citation and reference searches will return links to the journal article where the preprint was cited.

== Software and hardware ==
The software runs on a system that was written specifically for the ADS, allowing for extensive customization for astronomical needs that would not have been possible with general purpose database software. The scripts are designed to be as platform independent as possible, given the need to facilitate mirroring on different systems around the world, although the growing use of Linux as the operating system of choice within astronomy has led to increasing optimization of the scripts for installation on that platform.

The main ADS server is located at the Center for Astrophysics | Harvard & Smithsonian in Cambridge, Massachusetts, and is a dual 64-bit X86 Intel server with two quad-core 3.0 GHz CPUs and 32 GB of RAM, running the CentOS 5.4 Linux distribution. As of 2022, there are mirrors located in China, Chile, France, Germany, Japan, Russia, the United Kingdom, and Ukraine.

== Indexing ==
As of 2000, ADS received abstracts or tables of contents from almost two hundred journal sources. The service may receive data referring to the same article from multiple sources, and creates one bibliographic reference based on the most accurate data from each source. The common use of TeX and LaTeX by almost all scientific journals greatly facilitates the incorporation of bibliographic data into the system in a standardized format, and importing HTML-coded web-based articles is also simple. ADS utilizes Python and Perl scripts for importing, processing and standardizing bibliographic data.

The apparently mundane task of converting author names into a standard Surname, Initial format is actually one of the more difficult to automate, due to the wide variety of naming conventions around the world and the possibility that a given name such as Davis could be a first name, middle name or surname. The accurate conversion of names requires a detailed knowledge of the names of authors active in astronomy, and ADS maintains an extensive database of author names, which is also used in searching the database (see below).

For electronic articles, a list of the references given at the end of the article is easily extracted. For scanned articles, reference extraction relies on OCR. The reference database can then be "inverted" to list the citations for each paper in the database. Citation lists have been used in the past to identify popular articles missing from the database; mostly these were from before 1975 and have now been added to the system.

== Coverage ==
The database now contains over fifteen million articles. In the cases of the major journals of astronomy (Astrophysical Journal, Astronomical Journal, Astronomy and Astrophysics, Publications of the Astronomical Society of the Pacific and the Monthly Notices of the Royal Astronomical Society), coverage is complete, with all issues indexed from number 1 to the present. These journals account for about two-thirds of the papers in the database, with the rest consisting of papers published in over 100 other journals from around the world, as well as in conference proceedings.

While the database contains the complete contents of all the major journals and many minor ones as well, its coverage of references and citations is much less complete. References in and citations of articles in the major journals are fairly complete, but references such as "private communication", "in press" or "in preparation" cannot be matched, and author errors in reference listings also introduce potential errors. Astronomical papers may cite and be cited by articles in journals which fall outside the scope of ADS, such as chemistry, mathematics or biology journals.

== Search engine ==
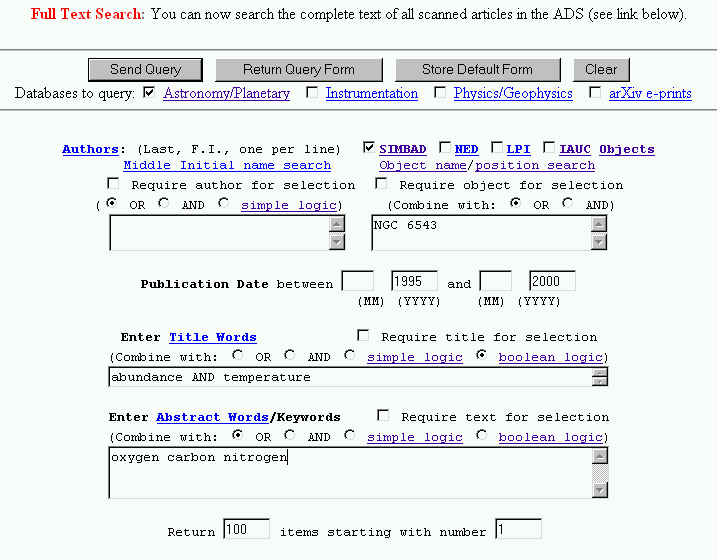
An example of a complex search combining object, title and abstract queries with a date filter

Since its inception, the ADS has developed a highly complex search engine to query the abstract and object databases. The search engine is tailor-made for searching astronomical abstracts, and the engine and its user interface assume that the user is well-versed in astronomy and able to interpret search results which are designed to return more than just the most relevant papers. The database can be queried for author names, astronomical object names, title words, and words in the abstract text, and results can be filtered according to a number of criteria. It works by first gathering synonyms and simplifying search terms as described above, and then generating an "inverted file", which is a list of all the documents matching each search term. The user-selected logic and filters are then applied to this inverted list to generate the final search results.

=== Author name queries ===
The system indexes author names by surname and initials, and accounts for the possible variations in spelling of names using a list of variations. This is common in the case of names including accents such as umlauts and transliterations from Arabic or Cyrillic script. An example of an entry in the author synonym list is:

AFANASJEV, V
AFANAS’EV, V
AFANAS’IEV, V
AFANASEV, V
AFANASYEV, V
AFANS’IEV, V
AFANSEV, V

=== Object name searches ===
The capability to search for papers on specific astronomical objects is one of ADS's most powerful tools. The system uses data from the SIMBAD, the NASA/IPAC Extragalactic Database, the International Astronomical Union Circulars and the Lunar and Planetary Institute to identify papers referring to a given object, and can also search by object position, listing papers which concern objects within a 10 arcminute radius of a given Right Ascension and Declination. These databases combine the many catalogue designations an object might have, so that a search for the Pleiades will also find papers which list the famous open cluster in Taurus under any of its other catalog designations or popular names, such as M45, the Seven Sisters or Melotte 22.

=== Title and abstract searches ===
The search engine first filters search terms in several ways. An M followed by a space or hyphen has the space or hyphen removed, so that searching for Messier catalogue objects is simplified and a user input of M45, M 45 or M-45 all result in the same query being executed; similarly, NGC designations and common search terms such as Shoemaker Levy and T Tauri are stripped of spaces. Unimportant words such as AT, OR and TO are stripped out, although in some cases case sensitivity is maintained, so that while and is ignored, And is converted to "Andromeda", and Her is converted to "Hercules", but her is ignored.

=== Synonym replacement ===
Once search terms have been preprocessed, the database is queried with the revised search term, as well as synonyms for it. As well as simple synonym replacement such as searching for both plural and singular forms, ADS also searches for a large number of specifically astronomical synonyms. For example, spectrograph and spectroscope have basically the same meaning, and in an astronomical context metallicity and abundance are also synonymous. ADS's synonym list was created manually, by grouping the list of words in the database according to similar meanings.

As well as English language synonyms, ADS also searches for English translations of foreign search terms and vice versa, so that a search for the French word soleil retrieves references to Sun, and papers in languages other than English can be returned by English search terms.

Synonym replacement can be disabled if required, so that a rare term which is a synonym of a much more common term (such as 'dateline' rather than 'date') can be searched for specifically.

=== Selection logic ===
The search engine allows selection logic both within fields and between fields. Search terms in each field can be combined with OR, AND, simple logic or Boolean logic, and the user can specify which fields must be matched in the search results. This allows complex searches to be built; for example, the user could search for papers concerning NGC 6543 OR NGC 7009, with the paper titles containing (radius OR velocity) AND NOT (abundance OR temperature).

=== Result filtering ===
Search results can be filtered according to a number of criteria, including specifying a range of years such as "1945 to 1975", "2000 to the present day" or "before 1900", and what type of journal the article appears in [–] non-peer-reviewed articles such as conference proceedings. These can be excluded or specifically searched for, or specific journals can be included in or excluded from the search.

== Search results ==
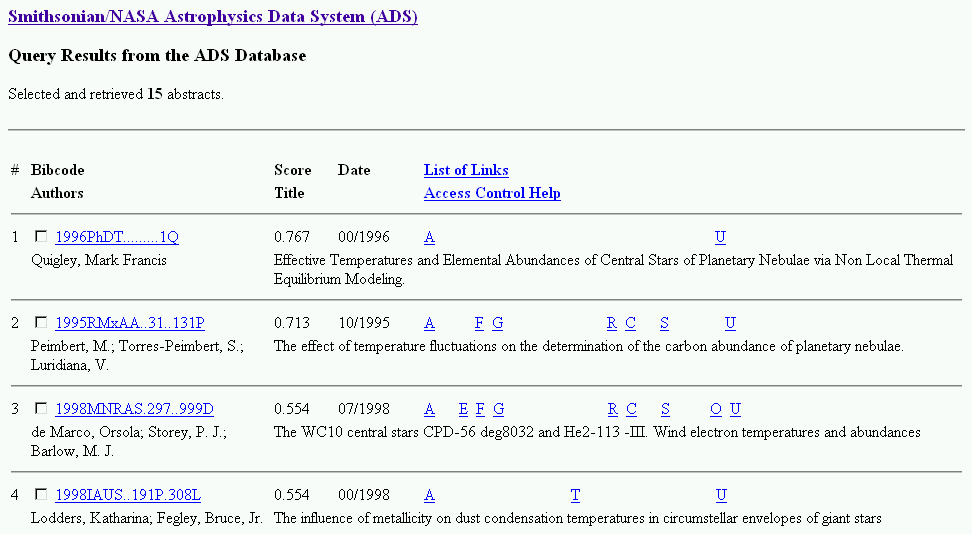
Search results page from ADS – A, F, G, C, R etc. are links to associated data for each abstract such as full-text article, citations, also-read papers and so on.

Although it was conceived as a means of accessing abstracts and papers, ADS provides a substantial amount of ancillary information along with search results. For each abstract returned, links are provided to other papers in the database which are referenced, and which cite the paper, and a link is provided to a preprint, where one exists. The system also generates a link to "also-read" articles – that is, those which have been most commonly accessed by those reading the article. In this way, an ADS user can determine which papers are of most interest to astronomers who are interested in the subject of a given paper.

Also returned are links to the SIMBAD and/or NASA Extragalactic Database object name databases, via which a user can quickly find out basic observational data about the objects analyzed in a paper, and find further papers on those objects.

== Impact on astronomy ==
ADS is almost universally used as a research tool among astronomers, and there are several studies that have estimated quantitatively how much more efficient ADS has made astronomy; one estimated that ADS increased the efficiency of astronomical research by 333 full-time equivalent research years per year, and another found that in 2002 its effect was equivalent to 736 full-time researchers, or all the astronomical research done in France. ADS has allowed literature searches that would previously have taken days or weeks to carry out to be completed in seconds, and it is estimated that ADS has increased the readership and use of the astronomical literature by a factor of about three since its inception.

In monetary terms, this increase in efficiency represents a considerable amount. There are about 12,000 active astronomical researchers worldwide, so ADS is the equivalent of about 5% of the working population of astronomers. The global astronomical research budget is estimated at between 4,000 and US$5,000 million, so the value of ADS to astronomy would be about 200–250 million USD annually. Its operating budget is a small fraction of this amount.

The great importance of ADS to astronomers has been recognized by the United Nations, the General Assembly of which has commended ADS on its work and success, particularly noting its importance to astronomers in the developing world, in reports of the United Nations Committee on the Peaceful Uses of Outer Space. A 2002 report by a visiting committee to the Center for Astrophysics, meanwhile, said that the service had "revolutionized the use of the astronomical literature", and was "probably the most valuable single contribution to astronomy research that the CfA has made in its lifetime".

== Sociological studies using ADS ==
Because it is used almost universally by astronomers, ADS can reveal much about how astronomical research is distributed around the world. Most users access the system from institutes of higher education, whose IP address can easily be used to determine the user's geographical location. Studies reveal that the highest per-capita users of ADS are France and Netherlands-based astronomers, and while more developed countries (measured by GDP per capita) use the system more than less developed countries; the relationship between GDP per capita and ADS use is not linear. The range of ADS usage per capita far exceeds the range of GDP per capita, and basic research carried out in a country, as measured by ADS usage, has been found to be proportional to the square of the country's GDP divided by its population. Statistics also imply that there are about three times as many astronomers in countries of European culture as in countries of Asian cultures, perhaps suggesting cultural differences in the importance attached to astronomical research. The amount of basic research carried out in a country is found to be proportional to the number of astronomers in that country multiplied by its GDP per capita, with considerable scatter.

ADS has also been used to show that the fraction of single-author astronomy papers has decreased substantially since 1975 and that astronomical papers with more than 50 authors have become more common since 1990.

== See also ==
- List of academic databases and search engines
- Bibcode
- INSPIRE-HEP
- NASA's Planetary Data System (PDS)
- PubMed
- Michael J. Kurtz
