= List of physics journals =

This is a list of physics journals with existing articles on Wikipedia. The list is organized by subfields of physics.

== By subject ==
=== General ===
- Acta Physica Polonica
- Advances in Physics
- American Journal of Physics
- Anales de Física
- Annalen der Physik
- Annales de chimie et de physique
- Annals of Physics
- Annual Review of Fluid Mechanics
- Applied Physics Letters
- Applied Physics Reviews
- Brazilian Journal of Physics
- Canadian Journal of Physics
- Central European Journal of Physics
- EPL (formerly known as Europhysics Letters)
- European Physical Journal - parts A-E, ST, AP
- Foundations of Physics
- Journal de Physique IV - Proceedings
- Journal of Applied Physics
- Journal of Experimental and Theoretical Physics
- Journal of the Korean Physical Society
- Journal of the Physical Society of Japan
- Journal of Physics, several journals
- Indian Journal of Physics
- Monthly Notices of the Royal Astronomical Society
- Nature Physics
- New Journal of Physics
- Open Physics
- Physica Scripta
- Physical Review Letters
- Physical Review X
- Physical Review Applied
- Physics Essays
- Physics Letters A
- Physics Reports
- Physics Today
- Physics-Uspekhi
- Pramana
- Progress of Theoretical and Experimental Physics
- Reports on Progress in Physics
- Reviews of Modern Physics
- SciPost Physics
- Wave Motion
- Zeitschrift für Naturforschung
- Zeitschrift für Naturforschung A

=== Astrophysics ===
- Advances in Space Research
- Annual Review of Astronomy and Astrophysics
- The Astronomical Journal
- Astronomy and Astrophysics
- Astroparticle Physics
- The Astrophysical Journal
- Astrophysics and Space Science
- Icarus
- Journal of Cosmology and Astroparticle Physics
- Journal of Geophysical Research
- Journal of the Korean Astronomical Society
- Monthly Notices of the Royal Astronomical Society
- Planetary and Space Science

=== Atomic, molecular, and optical physics ===
- European Physical Journal D
- Journal of Physics B
- Laser Physics
- Molecular Physics
- Physical Review A
- International Journal of Modern Physics B
- Modern Physics Letters B
- Physics Letters A

=== Plasmas ===
- Astrophysics and Space Science
- Canadian Journal of Physics
- European Physical Journal D
- IEEE Transactions on Plasma Science
- Journal of Applied Physics
- Journal of Geophysical Research
- Journal of Nuclear Materials
- Journal of Physics D
- Journal of Technological and Space Plasmas
- Journal of Vacuum Science and Technology
- Physical Review E
- Physics of Fluids
- Physics of Plasmas
- Planetary and Space Science
- Plasma Physics and Controlled Fusion
- Plasma Science and Technology
- Plasma Sources Science and Technology

=== Measurement ===
- Measurement Science and Technology
- Metrologia
- Review of Scientific Instruments

=== Nuclear and particle physics ===
- Acta Physica Polonica B
- Advances in High Energy Physics
- European Physical Journal A: Hadrons and Nuclei
- European Physical Journal C: Particles and Fields
- International Journal of Modern Physics E
- Journal of High Energy Physics
- Journal of Physics G: Nuclear and Particle Physics
- Modern Physics Letters A
- Nuclear Instruments and Methods in Physics Research
- Nuclear Physics A
- Nuclear Physics B
- Physics Letters B
- Physical Review C
- Physical Review D

=== Optics ===
- Applied Optics
- Applied Physics B
- Biomedical Optics Express
- Journal of Astronomical Telescopes, Instruments, and Systems
- Journal of Biomedical Optics
- Journal of Biophotonics
- Journal of the European Optical Society: Rapid Publications
- Journal of Modern Optics
- Journal of the Optical Society of America
- Journal of Optics
- Journal of Photonics for Energy
- Light: Science & Applications
- Nature Photonics
- Neurophotonics
- Optica
- Optical Engineering
- Optics Communications
- Optics Express
- Optics Letters
- Progress in Optics

=== Computational physics ===
- Computational Materials Science
- Computer Physics Communications
- International Journal of Modern Physics C (computational physics, physical computations)
- Journal of Computational Physics
- Physical Review E, section E13

=== Condensed matter and materials science ===
- Acta Materialia
- Applied Physics A
- Atomization and Sprays
- European Physical Journal B
- IEEE Transactions on Magnetics
- International Journal of Modern Physics B
- Journal of Magnetism and Magnetic Materials
- Journal of Physics: Condensed Matter
- Modern Physics Letters B
- Nature Materials
- Philosophical Magazine
- Philosophical Magazine Letters
- Physica B (condensed matter)
- Physica C (superconductivity)
- Physica E (nanostructures)
- Physica Status Solidi A/B/C/RRL
- Physical Review B (condensed matter and materials physics)
- Physics Letters A
- Physics of Fluids
- Science and Technology of Advanced Materials
- Solid State Communications
- Synthetic Metals
- Journal of Crystal Growth
- Crystal Growth & Design

=== Low temperature physics ===
- Journal of Low Temperature Physics
- Low Temperature Physics

=== Chemical physics ===
- Chemical Physics Letters
- Journal of Chemical Physics
- Journal of Physical Chemistry A
- Journal of Physical Chemistry B
- Journal of Physical Chemistry C
- Journal of Physical Chemistry Letters
- Physical Chemistry Chemical Physics

=== Soft matter physics ===
- European Physical Journal E
- Journal of Polymer Science Part B
- Soft Matter

=== Medical physics ===
- Australasian Physical & Engineering Sciences in Medicine
- BMC Medical Physics
- Bioelectromagnetics
- Health Physics
- Journal of Medical Physics
- Magnetic Resonance in Medicine
- Medical Physics
- Physics in Medicine and Biology

=== Biological physics ===
- Annual Review of Biophysics
- Biochemical and Biophysical Research Communications
- Biophysical Journal
- Biophysical Reviews and Letters
- Doklady Biochemistry and Biophysics
- European Biophysics Journal
- International Journal of Biological Macromolecules
- Physical Biology
- Radiation and Environmental Biophysics

=== Statistical and nonlinear physics ===
- Chaos
- Fractals
- International Journal of Bifurcation and Chaos
- Journal of Statistical Mechanics: Theory and Experiment
- Journal of Statistical Physics
- Nonlinear Dynamics
- Nonlinearity
- Physica A
- Physica D
- Physical Review E

=== Theoretical and mathematical physics ===
- Advances in Theoretical and Mathematical Physics
- Annales Henri Poincaré
- Classical and Quantum Gravity
- Communications in Mathematical Physics
- Electronic Journal of Theoretical Physics
- Entropy
- International Journal of Modern Physics A
- International Journal of Modern Physics D
- International Journal of Theoretical Physics
- Journal of Mathematical Physics
- Journal of Physics A: Mathematical and Theoretical
- Letters in Mathematical Physics
- Nuclear Physics B
- Progress of Theoretical and Experimental Physics
- Theoretical and Mathematical Physics
- Universe

=== Quantum information ===
- Quantum
- Journal of Quantum Information Science
- International Journal of Quantum Information
- npj Quantum Information

=== Geophysics and planetology ===
- Atmospheric Chemistry and Physics
- Geophysical & Astrophysical Fluid Dynamics formerly Geophysical Fluid Dynamics
- Geophysical Journal International formerly Geophysical Journal of the Royal Astronomical Society
- Geophysical Research Letters
- Icarus
- Journal of Geophysical Research
- Physics of the Earth and Planetary Interiors
- Planetary and Space Science
- Reviews of Geophysics

=== Acoustics ===
- Journal of Sound and Vibration
- Journal of the Acoustical Society of America
- Journal of Theoretical and Computational Acoustics

== See also ==
- List of scientific journals
- List of fluid mechanics journals
- List of materials science journals
