= Outline of applied physics =

Overview of and topical guide to applied physics

The following outline is provided as an overview of, and topical guide to, applied physics:

Applied physics – physics intended for a particular technological or practical use. It is usually considered as a bridge or a connection between "pure" physics and engineering.

Applied Physics – is the proper name of a journal founded and edited by Helmut K.V. Lotsch in 1972 and published by Springer-Verlag Berlin Heidelberg New York from 1973 on

Topics in Applied Physics – is the proper name of a series of quasi-monographs founded by Helmut K.V. Lotsch and published by Springer-Verlag Berlin Heidelberg New York

== Type of things that are applied physics ==
Applied physics can be described as all of the following:

- Branch of science
  - Branch of physics
  - Branch of applied science
- Branch of engineering

== Branches of applied physics ==
Fields and areas of research include:

- Accelerator physics
- Acoustics
- Agrophysics
- Analog electronics
- Astrodynamics
- Astrophysics
- Atomic, molecular, and optical physics
- Ballistics
- Biophysics
- Communication physics
- Computational physics
- Condensed matter physics
- Control theory
- Digital electronics
- Econophysics
- Experimental physics
- Engineering physics
- Fiber optics
- Fluid dynamics
- Force microscopy and imaging
- Geophysics
- Laser physics
- Medical physics
- Metrological physics
- Microfluidics
- Nanotechnology
- Nondestructive testing
- Nuclear engineering
- Nuclear technology
- Optics
- Optoelectronics
- Petrophysics
- Photonics
- Photovoltaics
- Plasma physics
- Quantum electronics
- Semiconductor physics and devices
- Soil physics
- Solid state physics
- Space physics
- Spintronics
- Superconductors
- Vehicle dynamics

== Applied physics institutions and organizations ==
- International Union of Pure and Applied Physics
- Harvard School of Engineering and Applied Sciences
- Applied Physics Laboratory, Johns Hopkins University
- National Institute of Physics, University of the Philippines Diliman
- Institute of Mathematical Science and Physics, University of the Philippines Los Baños
- School of Pure and Applied Physics, Mahatma Gandhi University
- Institute of Applied Physics and Computational Mathematics, Beijing, China
- Institute of Applied Physics, National Academy of Sciences of Ukraine
- School of Pure and Applied Physics, University of KwaZulu-Natal
- Department of Applied Physics, University of Karachi
- Department of Applied Physics and Materials Science, Northern Arizona University

== Applied physics publications ==
=== Applied physics journals ===
- American Institute of Physics
  - Journal of Applied Physics
  - Applied Physics Letters
- Japan Society of Applied Physics
  - Japanese Journal of Applied Physics
  - Applied Physics Express
- IOP Publishing
  - Journal of Physics D: Applied Physics
- Springer Berlin Heidelberg New York
  - Applied Physics
  - Applied Physics A
  - Applied Physics B
  - Topics in Applied Physics

== Persons influential in applied physics ==
- Nikola Tesla
- Michael Faraday

== See also ==
- Engineering physics/Engineering science
- Outline of applied science
- Outline of engineering
- Outline of physics
