= List of astronomy journals =

Overview of space science journals

This is a list of scientific journals publishing articles in astronomy, astrophysics, and other space sciences.

== A ==
- Acta Astronomica
- Advances in Space Research
- AIAA Journal
- AIP Conference Proceedings
- ..American Journal of Astronomy and Astrophysics..
- Annual Review of Astronomy and Astrophysics
- Annual Review of Earth and Planetary Sciences
- Astrobiology
- The Astronomical Journal
- L’Astronomie
- Astronomische Nachrichten
- Astronomy & Astrophysics
- The Astronomy and Astrophysics Review
- Astronomy and Computing
- Astronomy & Geophysics
- Astronomy Letters
- Astronomy Reports
- Astroparticle Physics
- The Astrophysical Journal
- The Astrophysical Journal Letters
- The Planetary Science Journal
- The Astrophysical Journal Supplement Series
- Astrophysics, a translation of the peer-reviewed Russian-language journal Astrofizika
- Astrophysics and Space Science

== B ==
- Baltic Astronomy
- Bulletin of the American Astronomical Society
- Bulletin of the Astronomical Society of India

== C ==
- Celestial Mechanics and Dynamical Astronomy
- Classical and Quantum Gravity
- Connaissance des Temps
- Cosmic Research

== E ==
- Earth and Planetary Science Letters
- Earth, Moon, and Planets

== G ==
- General Relativity and Gravitation
- Geophysical Research Letters

== I ==
- Icarus
- International Astronomical Union Circular
- International Journal of Astrobiology

== J ==
- Journal for the History of Astronomy
- Journal of Astronomical History and Heritage
- Journal of Astrophysics and Astronomy
- Journal of the American Association of Variable Star Observers
- Journal of Astronomical Instrumentation
- Journal of Astronomical Telescopes, Instruments, and Systems
- Journal of the British Astronomical Association
- Journal of the British Interplanetary Society
- Journal of Cosmology
- Journal of Cosmology and Astroparticle Physics
- Journal of Geophysical Research
- Journal of the Korean Astronomical Society
- Journal of the Royal Astronomical Society of Canada

== L ==
- Living Reviews in Solar Physics

== M ==
- Meteoritics & Planetary Science
- Monthly Notices of the Royal Astronomical Society

== N ==
- Nature Astronomy
- Nature Geoscience
- New Astronomy

== O ==
- The Observatory
- Open Astronomy
- Open European Journal on Variable Stars (OEJV)
- The Open Journal of Astrophysics (OJAp)
- Odessa Astronomical Publications (OAP)

== P ==
- Peremennye Zvezdy
- Pis’ma v Astronomicheskii Zhurnal
- Planetary and Space Science
- Publications of the Astronomical Society of Australia
- Publications of the Astronomical Society of Japan
- Publications of the Astronomical Society of the Pacific

== R ==
- Research in Astronomy and Astrophysics
- Research Notes of the AAS
- Revista Mexicana de Astronomía y Astrofísica

== S ==
- Serbian Astronomical Journal
- Solar Physics
- Solar System Research
- Space Science Reviews
- Sternenbote
