= Applied physics (disambiguation) =

Applied physics is physics which is intended for a particular technological or practical use.

Applied physics may also refer to:

== Scientific journals ==
- Applied Physics, issued as two separate publications:
  - Applied Physics A: Materials Science & Processing
  - Applied Physics B: Lasers and Optics
- American Institute of Physics journals:
  - Applied Physics Letters, published weekly
  - Applied Physics Reviews, published annually
- Applied Physics Express, a scientific journal publishing letters

== Institutions ==
- Applied Physics, Inc.
- Applied Physics Corporation, now the Cary Instruments division of Varian
- Applied Physics Laboratory Ice Station, U.S.A. and Japanese laboratory
- Johns Hopkins University Applied Physics Laboratory

== TV ==
- "Applied Physics" (Sliders), a television episode
