= Anil Bhardwaj =

Indian astrophysicist (born 1967)

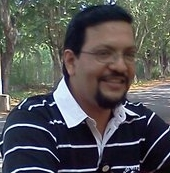
- Bhardwaj in 2011
- Born: 1 June 1967 (age 59); Mursan, Aligarh District, Uttar Pradesh, India
- Education: Lucknow University; Indian Institute of Technology, Banaras Hindu University
- Known for: Solar System X-rays; SARA/Chandrayaan-1; MENCA/Mangalyaan; Indian Space Program; Planetary exploration; CHACE-2/Chandrayaan-2
- Awards: Shanti Swarup Bhatnagar Award, 2007; Infosys Prize, 2016
- Scientific career
- Fields: Space and planetary science
- Workplaces: Indian Space Research Organization
- Doctoral advisor: Prof. R. P. Singhal

Anil Bhardwaj (born 1 June 1967) is an Indian astrophysicist. He is the director of the Physical Research Laboratory (PRL), which is a unit of the Department of Space of Government of India in Ahmedabad, India.

== Early life ==
Bhardwaj graduated in maths, statistics and physics with honours. He earned his Master of Science degree in physics from Lucknow University. He received his Doctorate in applied physics (planetary and space science) in 1992 from the Indian Institute of Technology, Banaras Hindu University in Varanasi.

== Career ==
Bhardwaj is the recipient of the Shanti Swarup Bhatnagar Award in 2007, and was awarded NRC Senior Research Associateship by US National Academy of Sciences in 2003. He worked at Marshall Space Flight Center, Huntsville, Alabama, from January 2004 to October 2005. He was awarded a fellowship by the United Nations Office of Outer Space Affairs, Vienna, Austria, in 1996. He is a Fellow of the Indian Academy of Sciences, Bangalore; Indian National Science Academy; National Academy of Sciences, India; Indian Geophysical Union; and Kerala Academy of Sciences. He was awarded ISRO Team Excellence Award for Chandrayaan-1 Science and Mission in 2008 and ISRO Merit award in 2012. He is a member of International Academy of Astronautics and International Astronomical Union. He is awarded Nehru Centenary Lecture of Kerala Academy of Sciences (2007), Planetary Science Distinguished Lecture of AOGS, Japan (2014), and the P. R. Pisharoty Memorial Lecture of the Kerala Science Congress (2015) He received the Distinguished Alumnus Award of Indian Institute of Technology (BHU) in 2015 and the international INSA-Vainu Bappu Memorial award in 2016. He won the Infosys Prize 2016 in the Physical Sciences category for his contributions in the field of Planetary Science and Exploration.

Bhardwaj is the Chairman of INSA-ICSU Committee for COSPAR, SCOSTEP and URSI and vice-chair of COSPAR Commission B.

He is a member of ISRO and national level committees on planetary and space sciences research in India and future planetary missions.

Bhardwaj wrote a chapter for Encyclopedia of the Solar System (2007; revised in 2014), edited 6 books, wrote invited reviews for international journals, including Reviews of Geophysics and has been guest editor of special issues of international journals.

He served as the president of Asia Oceania Geosciences Society (AOGS) Planetary Science Section from 2006 to 2010. He was the editor-in-chief of Advances in Geosciences from 2005 to 2012, and a member of editorial board of the European journal Planetary and Space Science from 2007 to 2009, Bulletin of Astronomical Society of India, and Current Science. He serves as the associate editor of Advances in Space Research, and as a member of editorial board of the European journal Space Science Reviews and Molecular Astrophysics.

== Research ==
Bhardwaj's research interests include theoretical and observational studies of planetary surfaces, atmospheres, ionospheres and their coupling with magnetospheric plasma and solar wind.

=== Principal Investigator ===
Bhardwaj was the principal investigator on various experiments on multiple space missions. These missions include the Chandrayaan-mission – the first Indian Lunar Mission, the first Indian Mars Orbiter Mission (MOM) and the Chandrayaan-2 mission. Experiments include the Sub-keV Atom Reflecting Analyzer (SARA) experiment, the MENCA experiment and the CHACE-2 experiment.

He was principal investigator and co-investigator on many observation programs with Chandra X-ray Observatory and Hubble Space Telescope of NASA; XMM-Newton X-ray Observatory of ESA; and Giant Meterwave Radio Telescope (GMRT) of India).
