= Pradyumn Kumar Sahoo =

Indian mathematician (born 1977)

Professor Pradyumn Kumar Sahoo
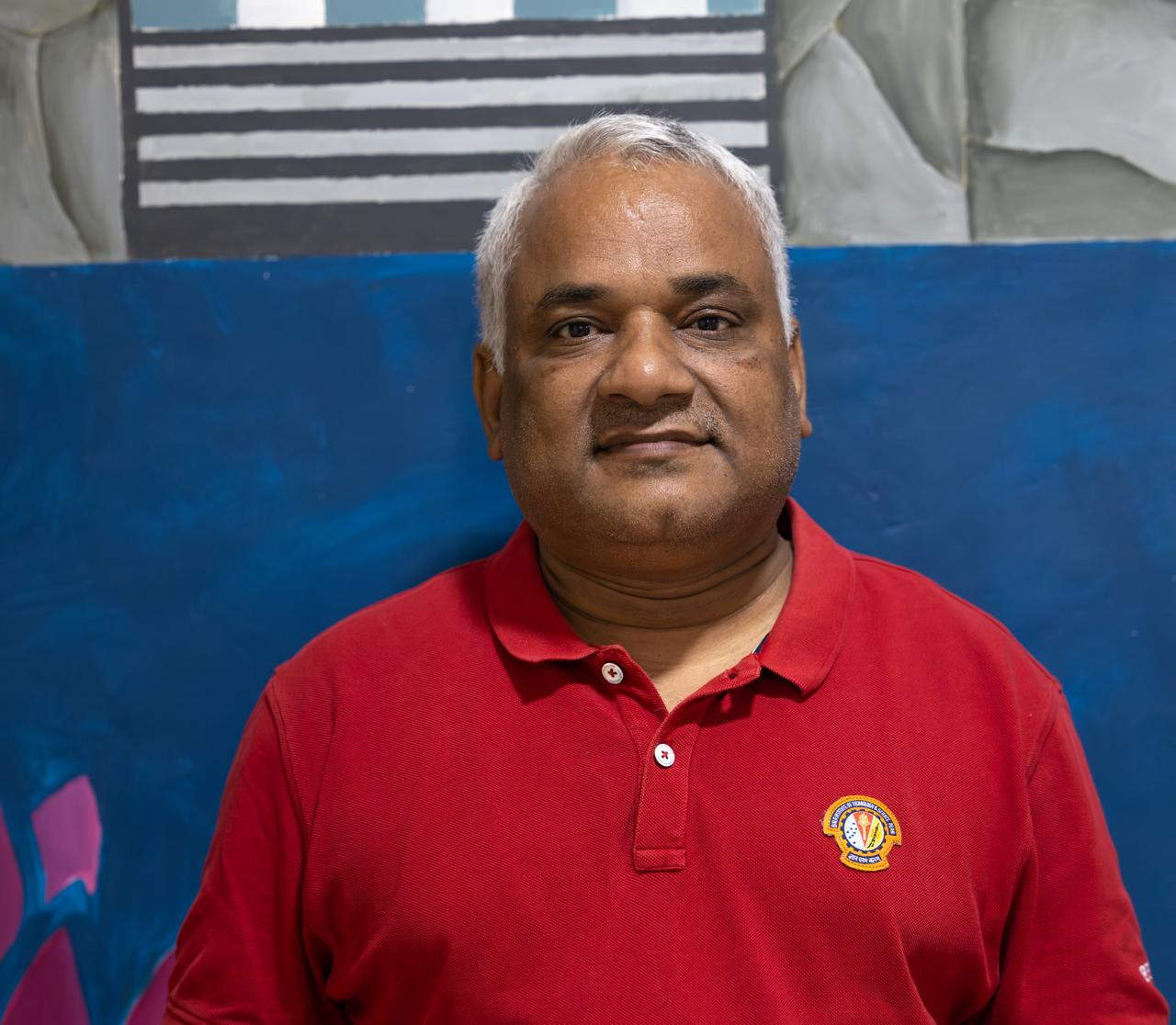
- Pradyumn Kumar Sahoo in his office at BITS, Pilani, 2025
- Born: 17 July 1977 (age 49)
- Citizenship: Indian
- Occupations: Mathematician, professor
- Employer: BITS Pilani

Academic background
- Education: M. Sc., M.Phil., Ph.D. (Mathematics), Sambalpur University

Pradyumn Kumar Sahoo (born 17 July 1977), also known as P. K. Sahoo, is an Indian academic, mathematician and researcher, currently professor at Birla Institute of Technology and Science, Pilani – Hyderabad Campus.

== Education and career ==
Sahoo was born on 17 July 1977. He completed M. Sc., M. Phil., and Ph. D. in Mathematics, all three from Sambalpur University. He started his career as a lecturer in 2002. He joined Birla Institute of Technology, Mesra, Ranchi in 2007. Currently, he is a professor at BITS-Pilani, Hyderabad, Campus.

Prof. P K Sahoo is an elected member of the International Astronomical Union (IAU), Associate Member of the Institute of Physics (IOP), Associate Member of Inter-University Centre for Astronomy and Astrophysics (IUCAA) and Council Member of the Indian Mathematical Society (IMS).

He is also elected as a TAS Fellow selected as a Visiting Scientist for the year 2027 under the prestigious President’s International Fellowship Initiative (PIFI) by the Chinese Academy of Sciences (CAS).

He is an editor for various journals including International Journal of Geometric Methods in Modern Physics, Open Physics Scientific Reports (Nature) and other reputed journals. He is the editorial board member of Universe, international advisory board member of Trends in Sciences and reviewer for journals such as Europhysic Letters (EPL), Canadian Journal of Physics and Frontiers in Astronomy and Space Sciences.

His research focuses on theoretical cosmological models in modified gravity theories. astrophysical objects, cosmic observations, relativity, dark energy, and observational datasets.
