= Barton Paul Levenson =

American writer (born 1960)

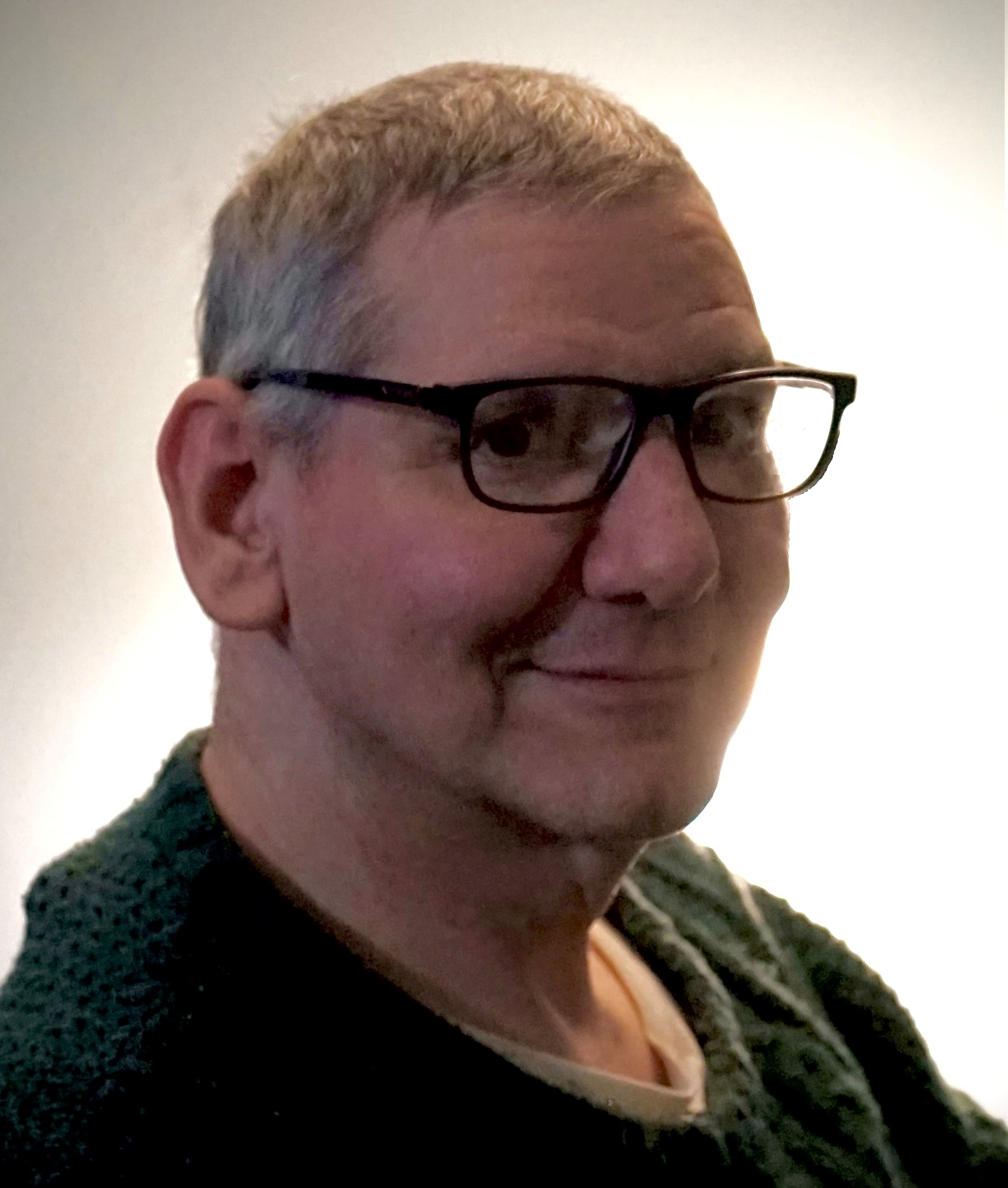
- Born: May 9, 1960 (age 66); Chapel Hill, North Carolina, U.S.
- Education: University of Pittsburgh
- Occupation: Writer
- Writing career
- Pen name: BPL
- Genres: Fantasy, science fiction
- Website: www.bartonlevenson.com

Barton Paul Levenson (born May 9, 1960) is an American writer of science fiction, fantasy and the macabre. He is author of eight novels and over 80 short stories, articles, reviews and other publications.

== Background ==
Levenson was born in Chapel Hill, North Carolina. He started writing in 1974. He is a 1983 graduate of the University of Pittsburgh. He became a Christian in 1984. His first work of fiction was a short story, "Twenty Peasants", published in Marion Zimmer Bradley's Fantasy Magazine in 1991. Levenson is a two-time winner of the "Confluence Science Fiction and Fantasy Short Story Contest" for "Virtual Bridges" and "Reality Forbidden". He is a long-standing member of one of Pittsburgh's oldest science-fiction and fantasy writer's workshops, Carnegie-Mellon University-based Pittsburgh Worldwrights, which includes Pittsburgh science fiction writer Kenneth Chiacchia among its members. He is a former member of the Science Fiction and Fantasy Writers of America.

Levenson's first separate novel in paperback format, I Will, was released in June 2010. One of Levenson's characters, Khuminay, returned in "Khuminay and the Servant" in Cosmic Crime Stories and "Khuminay and the Axe-Wielding Psycho", which appeared in Electric Spec. This followed his novel Year of the Human.

Levenson's Japan-themed story: "Temple Cat", cited below, is reprinted in the charity anthology: "Healing Waves" from Sky Warrior Book Publishing and edited by Phyllis Irene Radford, who donated all proceeds from the sales to disaster relief in Japan.

== Style ==
Reviewers consider Levenson's writing complex.

Levenson's focus on science fiction started when he was eight years old, when his parents took him to the film 2001: A Space Odyssey He described his writing process in a 2010 interview with author Sonya Clark, stating that he starts writing with either a broad plot outline in mind, or even one daydreamed scene. Often, the process will fail and the result is an incomplete work.

== Controversy ==
One of Levenson's most cited essays, "The Ideology of Robert A. Heinlein" has been reprinted in several languages (See Essays below). Levenson argues that Heinlein was making a case for the value of fascism. Levenson has been writing about climate issues for many years. His colloquies can often be found on: "Real Climate" *"RealClimate: From blog to Science". Levenson, B.P. 2024. RealClimate Levenson's first peer-reviewed scientific article as sole author was published in 2011: "Planet Temperatures with Surface Cooling Parameterized" in Advances in Space Research 47, 2044–2048, a COSPAR Publication of Elsevier Levenson's Japan-themed story: "Temple Cat", cited below, is reprinted in the charity anthology: "Healing Waves" from Sky Warrior Book Publishing and edited by Phyllis Irene Radford, who is donating all proceeds from the sales to disaster relief in Japan.

== Bibliography ==
=== Novels ===
- Another Century. RoseDog Books, 2022.
- Recovering Gretel. Kindle Direct Publishing, 2020
- Dark Gods of Alter Telluria. Barking Rain Press, 2016
- The Celibate Succubus. Barking Rain Press, 2013
- Year of the Human. Solstice Publishing, February 2012
- Max and Me. Lyrical Press, June 2010.
- I Will. Virtual Tales, June 2010.
- Ella the Vampire. Lyrical Press, December 2008 (See discussion of the basis of the novel).

=== Novellas ===
- "Parole". Lyrical Press: March 2009

=== Short fiction ===
- "Witches", Arcanist Online
- "Simulation Study", Heart of Flesh Literary Journal, Issue #12, November 2024
- "The Pretty Ones", Waystation, May 26, 2024
- "A Diagnosis at Dinner" Mystery Magazine, August 1, 2023
- "Chetwood's Unfortunate Connexion". In the 2022 anthology, Mermaidens, Ed. Matthew F. Amati, et al.
- "Elf Magic". In the 2021 anthology, Things With Feathers: Stories of Hope, by Third Flatiron Anthologies.
- " Alarmists". Every Day Fiction, October 4, 2021
- "Chetwood's Unfortunate Connexion". Tell-Tale Press, September 2019.
- "Kim and the Mantas" Abyss & Apex, September 19, 2017
- "Pen Pals" Expanded Horizons, Issue 56 August 2017
- "Buttons" Space and Time, #129, Summer 2017
- "Triangle" Perihelion SF, June 2016
- "Stealing a Starship" Electric Spec, 2015
- "Aquilonia, My Zelky" Perihelion SF, 2015
- "Khuminay and the Axe-Wielding Psycho" Electric Spec, 2014
- "Changing the Past", Daily SF, August 27, 2014
- "Investigation of Murder" Stone Thread Publishing, Anthology – The Least He Could Do, 2013,
- "In the Machine" Stone Thread Publishing, Anthology – Things You Can Create, 2013
- "Henry Fairfield" Cosmos Online, Luna Media Pty Ltd, 2013
- "The Commoner and the Queen". Anotherrealm, 2013
- "Lifting" Cosmos Online, Luna Media Pty Ltd, 2012
- "Arlena's House" Interstellar Fiction, 2012
- "The Beautiful Young Man" Vampires 2, 2012
- "The Wall" Anotherrealm, 2012
- "Sheep Lie!" Ray Gun Revival 2011
- "Ballad" Ray Gun Revival 2011
- "Sophie and the Supernova". in the anthology Cheer Up, Universe! (paperback) Whortleberry Press 2011
- "Gauntlet" Andromeda Spaceways In-flight Magazine (Australia) 2011
- "Brianna the Pie Girl" in the anthology: WTF?!, Pink Narcissus Press, 2011
- "Khuminay and the Servant" in Cosmic Crime Stories, published by Karen L. Newman July 2011.
- "An Exercise in Logic" in the anthology Infinite Space, Infinite God II (paperback) 2011
- "Khuminay and the Shapeshifter" in the anthology Space Cops, compiled by David Reilly June 2009.
- "The Boogie-Woogie, Time-Traveling, Cyborg Blues" Electric Spec February 2009
- "Colonizing Mars" M-Brane 2008
- "The Primitives" Wrong World (Audio) 2008
- "Second Visit" Whispering Spirits Issue Number 19 – November 20, 2008
- "Raid" Atomjack Issue Number 11 – August 2008
- "Wisdom". Anathema On-Line Anthology, January 2008
- "Wifey". Written Word, Holiday Edition 2007
- "The Fate of the Crystal Eye". In the anthology Forbidden Speculation (2007)
- "Side Trip". Science Fiction Trails, No. 2, 2007
- "Katie Belle". Whispering Spirits, October 2007
- "Dedication Day". Art & Prose, October 2007
- "The Rescue". Beyond Centauri, Issue 18, 2007
- "Problem in Logic". Staffs & Starships, Issue 1, 2007
- "The Extraordinary Circumstances On Board H.M.S. Steadfast". Cicada, January–February 2007.
- "The Curse". In the anthology Shadow Regions (2006)
- "Rain and Revenge". RAGE Machine Issue #2, March 2006
- "The Intruder". In the anthology, Travel Guide to the Haunted Mid-Atlantic Region (2006)
- "Pet Cat". In the anthology Animal Magnetism (2005)
- "All the Horrible Dragons". The Sword Review, December 2005.
- "Undead". Insidious Reflections, July 2005.
- "The Problem of Pain". The Sword Review, July 2005. Forum
- "The Horror in the Monkey-Squeezing Room". ScienceFictionFantasyHorror.com, June 2005.
- "Temple Cat". Cricket, Vol. 32 Issue 10, p20-26, June 2005.
- "The Closet". Chiaroscuro, March 2003, see also podcast Read by British actor Alasdair Stuart Pluggd TV.
- "Writer's Block". Dark Seasons, January 2003.
- "Along with Captain Gooding". Future Orbits, Vander Neut Publications LLC June 2002.
- "Scrunched Up". Future Orbits, Vander Neut Publications LLC February 2002.
- "Sometimes We Lie". Eternity On-Line, March 2000. Reprinted in the anthology Leaps of Faith 2003, (Writer's Cafe Press.)
- "The Physics of Space Beer Considered as a Helix of Semi-Precious Clones". Maelstrom, April 1999.
- "Reality Forbidden". Confluence Program Book 1998 (First Prize Winner).
- "Virtual Bridges". Confluence Program Book 1997 (First Prize Winner).
- "Twenty Peasants". Marion Zimmer Bradley's Fantasy Magazine, August 1991.

=== Short fiction (unpublished) ===
- "The Starship Pilot", scheduled for the anthology 'Warrior Wisewoman IV', Roby James Editor, 2012

=== Poems ===
- "Disobedient" Apex Magazine January 13, 2017
- "Do Red Dwarfs Have Habitable Planets?" Astropoetica Volume 7.1, Spring 2009
- "Off-Topic". Astropoetica Volume 4.2, Spring 2006

=== Essays ===
- "The Ideology of Robert A. Heinlein". The New York Review of Science Fiction, June 1998. Reprinted in Gigamesh (Spain) 1999; reprinted in Ikarie (Czech Republic) 2003. "In a scorching analysis, Barton Paul Levenson has attempted to show that his [Robert A. Heinlein's] final point was a version of fascism (Levenson, 1998)." p. 59, X, Y, Z, T: Damien Broderick

=== Book reviews ===
- "A Soldier's Duty (Theirs Not to Reason Why) by Jean Johnson". The New York Review of Science Fiction, December 2020 . Literary Criticism by Barton Paul Levenson
- "S. L. Viehl's Stardoc. The New York Review of Science Fiction, November 2002.
- "Jeffrey Sackett's Candlemas Eve. The New York Review of Science Fiction, March 2001.
- "James White's The Dream Millennium. The New York Review of Science Fiction, April 1999.

=== Non-fiction and scientific ===
- " A Comprehensive Semigray Climate Model." Levenson, B.P. 2024.Planetary and Space Science,J. Elsevier., 243, 105866.
- " The maximum tolerable gravity for human colonies. ". Levenson, B.P. 2023.Journal of the British Interplanetary Society,J. Brit. Interplanet. Soc., 76, 87-93.
- " Pressure doesn't make Venus hot: A computer exercise. ". Levenson, B.P. 2023. Physics Education, Phys. Ed. 58, 055019
- " Probability or determinism: How rare is ETI? ". Levenson, B.P. 2022. Journal of the British Interplanetary Society,J. Brit. Interplanet. Soc., 75, 348-356.
- " A demonstration that frictional heating of Earth is trivial ". Levenson, B.P. 2022. Physics Education,Phys. Ed. 57, 065025
- " Habitable Zones with an Earth Climate History Model ". Levenson, B.P. 2021. Planetary and Space Science, 206
- "A Catalog of Smaller Planets". Levenson, B.P. 2019. Earth, Moon, and Planets, 122, 83-93
- Theory of Habitable Planets self-publication, August 7, 2017
- "Why Hart Found Narrow Ecospheres--A Minor Science Mystery Solved". Levenson, B.P. 2015. Astrobiology, 15, 327-330
- "Planet Temperatures with Surface Cooling Parameterized". Levenson, B.P. 2011. Advances in Space Research, 47, 2044–2048.
- "Analysis of the August 17, 1989 Total Lunar Eclipse". The Strolling Astronomer (J. Am. Lunar Planetary Soc.) 38, 61–64. Graham, Francis G. and B.P. Levenson 1995.
- "An Examination of Jules Verne's Moon Gun, 'Columbiad'". Selenology 7, 19–21. Levenson, B.P. 1988.
- "Social Design Considerations for a Lunar Colony". Selenology 6, 22–28. Levenson, B.P. 1987.
- "Statistical Data on Orthoselection for Intelligence". Tripolitan (J. Tripoli Sci. Assn.) 15, 5–10. Levenson, B.P. 1983.

== Awards ==
- "StorySouth Million Writers Award" 2009 Notable Stories 2009 "The Boogie-Woogie, Time-Traveling, Cyborg Blues" by Barton Paul Levenson

== Reviews ==
- A Succubi's Tale – "A Review of The Celibate Succubus by Barton Paul Levenson" Tera December 22, 2013
- Rise Reviews – "I Will by Barton Paul Levenson" Beatrice Underwood-Sweet January 1, 2011
- Toni V. Sweeney – "Max and Me by Barton Paul Levenson" Toni V. Sweeney August 19, 2010
- Bookwenches – "Max and Me" Bobby D. Whitney August 17, 2010
- Manic Readers – "Ella The Vampire" Stacey May 2, 2010
- Marginalia – "The Boogie-Woogie, Time-Traveling, Cyborg Blues" Boudica June 16, 2009
- E Book Guru – "Parole" Staff March 23, 2009
- You Gotta Read Reviews – "Parole" Stephanie March 12, 2009
- Emmatyville – "Parole" Emma Wayne Porter March 2, 2009
- Dark Diva Reviews – "Ella The Vampire" Jennifer Campbell February 23, 2009
- You Gotta Read Reviews – "Ella The Vampire" Tami February 22, 2009
- Literary Nymphs – "Parole" Scandalous Minx February 18, 2009
- Toasted Scimitar – "Raid" Staff August 12, 2008
- Blogtide Rising – "Problem in Logic" Deven D Atkinson January 4, 2008
- Horror World – "The Curse" Joe Kroeger January 2007
- Tangent Online – "All the Horrible Dragons" Paul Abbamondi October 14, 2006
- Oz Horror Scope (Australia) – "The Curse" Miranda Siemienowicz August 9, 2006
- Tangent Online – "The Curse" Janice Clark December 24, 2005

== Interviews ==
- "The Celibate Succubus: Barton Paul Levenson" Book Signing at Rickert and Beagle Books, Dormont, Pennsylvania, November 16, 2013 "Barton Paul Levenson Book Signing" – YouTube
- "Monday's Friend: Barton Paul Levenson" Imaginary Friends, Sara Jayne Townsend, July 8, 2013
- "Books and Tales Author Interview: Barton Paul Levenson" Books and Tales, Annette Gisby, May 30, 2012
- "Page Readers Talks with Barton Paul Levenson" BlogTalkRadio – Hosted by Page Readers, February 2010
- "Interview with B.P. Levenson" Art & Prose, October 2007, p. 40. #61 Showcase Writer
