= Cho Gyeong-chul =

South Korean astronomer

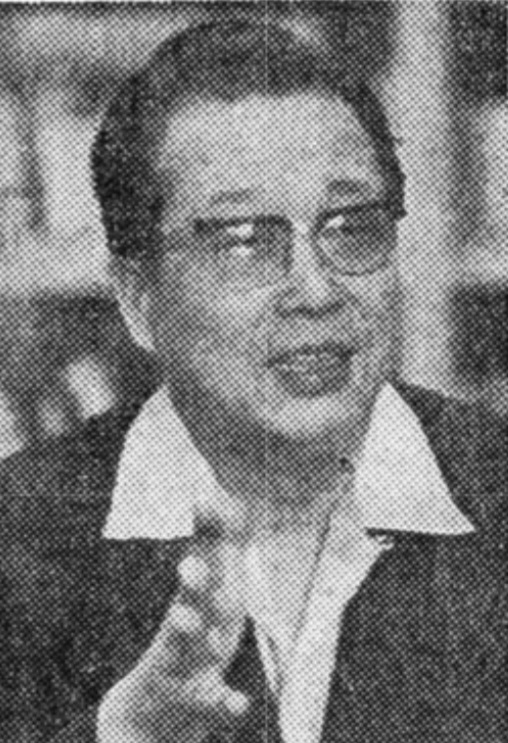
Cho Gyeong-chul

Cho Gyeong-chul (Korean: 조경철, April 4, 1929 – March 6, 2010) was a South Korean astronomer who worked at NASA and the US Naval Observatory.

== Biography ==
He was born in Sonchon, Pyongannam-do. He finished his middle and high school courses at Pyongyang and was then admitted to Yonhui University. During the Korean War he served in the South Korean army, and in 1952 he was a professor at the South Korean military academy. In 1954 he graduated in physics from Yonhui University.

After graduating, he went to the United States to study further. He studied politics at Tusculum College, however he later changed his major to astronomy at University of Michigan and finally received his doctorate in astronomy from the University of Pennsylvania.

After obtaining his doctorate, he worked for several corporations, observatories and university in the 1960s, most notably at the United States Naval Observatory and NASA. He went back to South Korea in 1968, where he worked as a professor at Yonsei University, and opened a new department of astronomy and space. He also became chairman of the Korean Astronomical Society (KAS) and Korean Amateur Astronomical Society. In 1969, he interpreted the Apollo 11 Moon landing broadcast on American Forces Korean Network. While he was interpreting, he became so excited that he fell out of his chair. This situation was broadcast widely in Korea, and after that he received the nickname "아폴로 박사."("Apollo baksa", which means "Dr. Apollo")

Later in life, he developed heart disease, and was hospitalized in Severance Hospital with high fever on March 2, 2010. He later suffered a heart attack and lost consciousness. He died on March 6, 2010.

== Awards and honors ==
Asteroid 4976 Choukyongchol, discovered by astronomer Kazuro Watanabe in 1991, was named in his honor. The official naming citation was published by the Minor Planet Center on 30 November 2001 (M.P.C. 44110).
