= 1155 Aënna =

Main-belt asteroid

Discovery
- Discovered by: K. Reinmuth
- Discovery site: Heidelberg Obs.
- Discovery date: 26 January 1928

Designations
- Named after: Astronomische Nachrichten (Astronomy journal)
- Alternative designations: 1928 BD · 1928 FU; 1941 UZ · 1982 DR_{6}
- Minor planet category: main-belt · (inner)

Orbital characteristics
- Epoch 4 September 2017 (JD 2458000.5)
- Uncertainty parameter 0
- Observation arc: 89.44 yr (32,668 days)
- Aphelion: 2.8697 AU
- Perihelion: 2.0586 AU
- Semi-major axis: 2.4641 AU
- Eccentricity: 0.1646
- Orbital period (sidereal): 3.87 yr (1,413 days)
- Mean anomaly: 351.13°
- Mean motion: 0° 15^{m} 17.28^{s} / day
- Inclination: 6.5935°
- Longitude of ascending node: 39.122°
- Argument of perihelion: 195.38°

Physical characteristics
- Dimensions: 9.284±0.524 km 11.36 km (derived); 11.70±0.75 km 14.093±0.105 km
- Synodic rotation period: 8.07±0.04 h
- Geometric albedo: 0.2169 (derived); 0.2252±0.0212; 0.329±0.045; 0.356±0.040
- Spectral type: SMASS = Xe · X
- Absolute magnitude (H): 11.5 · 11.90 · 12.0 · 12.41±0.79

1155 Aënna, provisional designation 1928 BD, is an asteroid from the inner regions of the asteroid belt, approximately 11 kilometers in diameter. It was discovered on 26 January 1928, by German astronomer Karl Reinmuth at Heidelberg Observatory in southwest Germany. It is named for the astronomy journal Astronomische Nachrichten.

== Orbit and classification ==
In the SMASS taxonomy, the X-type asteroid is classified as a Xe-type, an intermediary that transitions to the bright E-type asteroids. The spectra of a Xe-type contains an absorption feature near 0.49 μm, which is thought to be related with the presence of the iron sulfide mineral troilite, typically found in lunar and Martian meteorites. Aënna orbits the Sun in the inner main-belt at a distance of 2.1–2.9 AU once every 3 years and 10 months (1,413 days). Its orbit has an eccentricity of 0.16 and an inclination of 7° with respect to the ecliptic. The body's observation arc begins at Heidelberg with its official discovery observation in 1928.

== Physical characteristics ==
=== Rotation period ===
French amateur astronomer René Roy obtained a rotational lightcurve of Aënna from photometric observations taken in December 2015. Lightcurve analysis gave a rotation period of 8.07 hours with a brightness variation of 0.28 magnitude (U=2+).

=== Diameter and albedo ===
According to the surveys carried out by the Japanese Akari satellite and NASA's Wide-field Infrared Survey Explorer with its subsequent NEOWISE mission, Aënna measures between 9.28 and 14.09 kilometers in diameter, and its surface has an albedo between 0.225 and 0.356. The Collaborative Asteroid Lightcurve Link agrees best with Akari, and derives an albedo of 0.2169 with a diameter of 11.36 kilometers and an absolute magnitude of 12.0.

== Naming ==
This minor planet was named after Astronomische Nachrichten, one of the first international journals in the field of astronomy. The constructed name "Aënna" contains the German pronunciation of the initials "A" and "N" followed by the mandatory feminine ending used for asteroids. The naming was proposed by the Astronomisches Rechen-Institut and mentioned in The Names of the Minor Planets by Paul Herget in 1955 (H 108).
