= Elizabeth Penrose =

Elizabeth Penrose may refer to:

- Mrs Markham, pseudonym of Elizabeth Penrose (1780–1837), English writer
- Elizabeth Penrose Howkins (1900-1972), fashion editor
- Beth Penrose, a character in Plum Island
- Elizabeth Humphreys Penrose (born 1960), American writer of poetry in the science fiction genre
