= Elizabeth Humphreys Penrose =

American poet (born 1960)

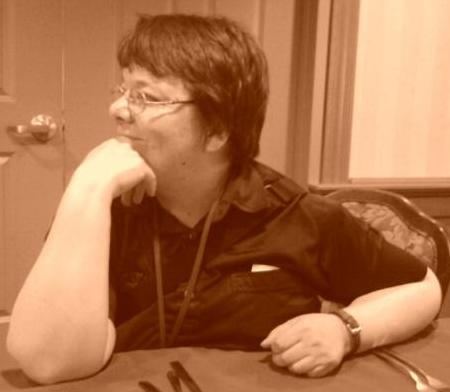
- Born: December 30, 1960 (age 65); Wilmington, Delaware, US
- Occupation: Writer
- Writing career
- Pen name: EHP
- Genres: Poetry, Science fiction

Elizabeth Humphreys Penrose (born December 30, 1960) is an American writer of poetry in the science fiction genre. She is a long-standing member of one of Pittsburgh's oldest Science-Fiction and Fantasy Writer's Workshops, Carnegie-Mellon University-based Pittsburgh Worldwrights, which was founded by Mary Soon Lee and includes Pittsburgh science fiction writers Barton Paul Levenson and Kenneth Chiacchia among its members, see Pittsburgh#Writing. Penrose was raised in Pittsburgh, Pennsylvania. She is a graduate of the University of Pittsburgh with a Bachelor's in English and Master's in English Literature.

== Biography ==
Penrose was born in Wilmington, Delaware in 1960 but was brought to Pittsburgh, Pennsylvania at the age of 2 and has lived there ever since. Elizabeth Penrose is building a list of publications, including her poems in Star*Line, Wicked Hollow and Pedestal Magazine. She teaches a class in poetry reading and writing at a social service agency connected with University of Pittsburgh Medical Centers. She views herself as a Christian Socialist, Feminist, Pacifist.

== Bibliography ==
=== Poems ===
- "Silence", Voices From the Attic, Anthology, Carlow University Press, Pittsburgh, PA, 2011
- "Never", Voices From the Attic, Anthology, Carlow University Press, Pittsburgh PA, 2011
- "A Wrong Turn", Asimov's Science Fiction, August 2010
- "The Land of the Golden Purse", Beyond Centauri, June 2010
- "Hives" Abyss & Apex Issue 27
- "To D.M. Pinkwater" Mindflights, 2008 (Out of print) mindflights.com
- "Seeing The Dragon" Mindflights, 2008 (Out of print) mindflights.com
- "A Pacifist in Wartime" The Pedestal Magazine THE POLITICAL ANTHOLOGY 2004
- "An Explanation," Wicked Hollow #December 7, 2003
- "The Prince Who Killed A Dragon" EOTU Ezine Volume 4, Issue 2 ISSN 1530-7336 April 2003
- "A Girl's Game" Star*Line Issue 25.3, May/June 2002

=== Contest wins and accolades ===
- "Scientific Experiment 1927" Judge's Picks W. Gregory Stewart's choices 2008 Science Fiction Poetry Association Contest Winners
- "Spring Morning" Nippon 2007 Haiku Contest
