= Paul Levinson bibliography =

This is a list of works by Paul Levinson, American author.

== Novels ==
- The Silk Code (1999) Tor Books ISBN 0-312-86823-5
- Borrowed Tides (2001) Tor Books ISBN 0-312-84869-2
- The Consciousness Plague (2002) Tor Books ISBN 0-7653-0098-2
- The Pixel Eye (2003) Tor Books ISBN 0-7653-0556-9
- The Plot To Save Socrates (2006) Tor Books ISBN 0-7653-0570-4
- Unburning Alexandria (2013) JoSara Media ISBN 978-15617-80129
- Chronica (2014) JoSara Media ISBN 978-1-56178-031-0
- It's Real Life: An Alternate History of The Beatles (2024) Connected Editions ISBN 978-1-56178-088-4

== Short fiction ==
Stories

- "Aaron Judge on the Cape" Amazing Stories, 100th Anniversary issue, Spring 2026
- "In the Dybbuk's Pocket" Vocal, August 2025

audiobook, Listen & Live Audio, September 2025

- "I Fell in Love with a Robot" (poem), New Explorations, November 2024

Reprinted in Etc, October 2025

- "It's Real Life" Vocal, January 2022

winner, Mary Shelley Award for Outstanding Fiction, 2023
finalist, Sidewise Award for Alternate History (short form), 2022
basis of radioplay, "It's Real Life," aired on Killerwatt Radio, March 2023, audiobook, Listen & Live Audio, April 2023
basis of novel, 2024

- "Foreseeable" AcademFic, December 2020
- "Robinson Calculator" (novelette), Connected Editions, 2019.

Reprinted in Robots Through the Ages, eds. Robert Silverberg and Bryan Thomas Schmidt, 2023.

- "The P & A" Amazing Stories, Fall 2019.
- "The Whether App" Amazing Stories, Spring 2019.
- "Slipping Time" Amazing Stories, Fall 2018.
- "Marilyn and Monet" (novelette), Connected Editions, 2017.

audiobook, Listen & Live Audio, July 2024

- "Last Calls" (novella), Connected Editions, 2015.
- "The Other Car," Connected Editions, 2015.
- "The Kyss" in Speculative St. Valentine's Day Drabbles, eds. Jorge Salgado-Reyes & Roy C. Booth, Indie Authors Press, 2015.
- "The Wallet," The Sci Phi Journal, vol. 4, February 2015.
- "Sam's Requests," Buzzy Mag, January 2015
- "Synchronicity," Buzzy Mag, April 2014.
- "And the Chimps Shall Lead," in Something to Take on the Trip, ed. S. Wilkinson, 2014.

Reprinted in Something to Read, ed. S. Wilkinson, 2014.

- "The Last Train to Margaretville," in Walk the Fire 2, ed. J. Mierau, 2013.
- "Transfer of Power," in Something for the Journey, ed. S. Wilkinson, 2013.

Reprinted in Something to Read, ed. S. Wilkinson, 2014

- "Ian, George, and George" (novelette), Analog, December 2013.
- "Extra Credit," Buzzy Media, July 2012.

Reprinted in Altered States, eds. Jorge Salgado-Reyes & Roy C. Booth, Indie Authors Press, 2014

- "Ian, Isaac, and John" (novelette), Analog, November 2011, pp. 75–85.
- "Ian's Ions and Eons" (novelette), Analog, April 2011, pp. 40–51.
- "Unburning Alexandria" (novelette), Analog, November 2008, pp. 116–133.
- "Nathan's Famous," in Coney Island Wonder Stories, ed. Bob Howe & John Ordover, Berkeley Heights, NJ: Wildside, 2005, pp. 86–91.
- "Critical View," in Microcosms, ed. Gregory Benford, New York: Daw, 2004, pp. 281–300.
- "The Protected," in Silicon Dreams, ed. Larry Segriff & Martin H. Greenberg, New York: Daw, 2001, pp. 221–236.
- "The Man Who Brought Down The New York Times," Analog, December 2000, p. 78.

Reprinted in Science Fiction for the Throne, eds. Tom Easton & Judith Dial, Fantastic Books, 2017.
Reprinted in The Chronos Chronicles, eds. Roy C. Booth & Jorge Salgado-Reyes, Indie Authors Press, 2018.

- "Smart Weapon," in Guardsmen of Tomorrow, ed. Larry Segriff & Martin H. Greenberg, New York: Daw, 2000, pp. 90–106.
- "The Enduring Test," Nature, 27 April 2000, p. 937.
- "The Suspended Fourth," in Star Colonies, ed. Ed Gorman, Martin H. Greenberg & John Helfers, New York: Daw, 2000, and Analog, March 2000, pp. 72–83.
- "Le Juge du 1er Circuit" (French translation of "The 1st Circuit Judge," first published in Best Seller by Paul Levinson, 1999), translation by Ollivier Dyens, Chair et Metal (online Webzine), December 1999
- "Late Lessons," (cover story, novelette) Analog, October 1999, pp. 10–37.
- "Location," in The Age of Reason, ed. Kurt Roth, Plano, TX: SffNet Press, 1999, pp. 53–64.
- "Little Differences," (novelette) Analog, June 1998, pp. 38–56.

HOMer Award (Compuserve) Finalist (novelette), 1999

- "The Orchard," (novelette) Analog, February 1998, pp. 72–90.

HOMer Award (Compuserve) Finalist (novelette), 1999

- "Advantage, Bellarmine," Analog, January 1998, pp. 104–110.

HOMer Award (Compuserve) Finalist (short story), 1999

- "A Medal for Harry," in Black Mist and Other Japanese Futures, ed. Orson Scott Card & Keith Ferrell, New York: Daw, 1997.

HOMer Award (Compuserve) Finalist (short story), 1998

- "Loose Ends," (novella) Analog, May 1997, pp. 10–51.

Reprinted in Italian translation as "Niente fuori posto" in Strani Universi, translated and edited by Piergiorgio Nicolazzinni, Editrice Nord, 1998
Hugo Award Nominee, 1998
Nebula Award Nominee, 1998
Sturgeon Best Short Science Fiction Finalist, 1998
AnLab Award, First Runner-up, 1998

- "The Mendelian Lamp Case," (novelette) Analog, April 1997, pp. 118–146.

Reprinted in The Hard SF Renaissance, edited by David G. Hartwell & Kathryn Cramer, Tor, 2002
Translated and reprinted in Ikarie (Czech Republic), 2002
Reprinted in Science Fiction Theater, ed. Brian Forbes, Quadrillion/MGM, 1999.
Reprinted in Year's Best SF3, ed. by David G. Hartwell, Harper Prism, 1998.
Locus Recommended Stories, March 1997

- "The Copyright Notice Case," (novelette) Analog, April 1996, pp. 18–46.

HOMer Award (Compuserve), best science fiction novelette, 1996
Nebula Award Nominee, 1998

- "The Chronology Protection Case," (novelette) Analog, September 1995, pp. 100–118.

Reprinted in The Mammoth Book of Time Travel, ed. Mike Ashley, Robinson Books, 2013
Reprinted in The Best Time Travel Stories of All Time, ed. Barry Malzberg, I-Books, 2003.
basis of radioplay, "The Chronology Protection Case," performed at the Museum of Television and Radio, NYC, September 2002, and nominated for the Mystery Writers of America Edgar Award for Best Play, 2002, audiobook, Listen & Live Audio, 2004.
basis of movie, "The Chronology Protection Case," produced and directed by Jay Kensinger, shown at science fiction conventions in New York, Boston, and Philadelphia, 2002; re-cut, with new, extended ending, 2013, on Amazon Prime
Reprinted in Nebula Awards 32: SFWA's Choices for the Best Science Fiction and Fantasy of the Year, ed. Jack Dann, Harcourt Brace, 1998.
Reprinted in Infinite Edge (online magazine), June–July 1997
Reprinted in Supernatural Sleuths, ed. C. G. Waugh & M. Greenberg, ROC Books, 1996
Sturgeon Best Short Science Fiction Finalist, 1996
Nebula Award Nominee, 1997

- "The Kid in the Video Store," Through the Corridor, March 1995, pp. 11–15.
- "The Way of Flesh," Analog, Feb 1995, pp. 55–57.
- "The Harmony," in Xanadu 3, ed. Jane Yolen, NY: Tor, 1995, pp. 15–28.
- "The Softsmith," Galaxy, Nov-Dec, 1994, pp. 74–75.
- "Post Plato," Galaxy, Sept-Oct, 1994, pp. 48–49.
- "Laughing Willows," Radius (electronic/disk magazine), Sept 1994.
- "Grace Under Pressure," in Swashbuckling Editors, ed. John Betancourt, Berkeley Heights, NJ: Wildside Press, 1993.
- "Last Things First," Mindsparks, 1 (3), 1993.
- "Albert's Cradle," Amazing Stories, February 1993.
- "Best Seller," Fresh Ink, 1 (1), 1991.
- "The New Zoological Gardens," (novelette) Infinity, Ltd., May 1991.
- "The Thing in Itself," The Omega Chronicles, January 1991.

== Non-fiction books ==
- In Pursuit of Truth: Essays on the Philosophy of Karl Popper on the Occasion of his 80th Birthday (editor and contributor) with Forewords by Isaac Asimov and Helmut Schmidt (1982) Humanities Press ISBN 0-391-02609-7
- Mind at Large: Knowing in the Technological Age (1988) JAI Press ISBN 0-89232-816-9
- Electronic Chronicles: Columns of the Changes in our Time (1992) Anamnesis Press ISBN 0-9631203-3-6
- Learning Cyberspace: Essays on the Evolution of Media and the New Education (1995) Anamnesis Press ISBN 0-9631203-9-5
- The Soft Edge: A Natural History and Future of the Information Revolution (1997) Routledge ISBN 0-415-15785-4
- Bestseller: Wired, Analog, and Digital Writings (1999) Pulpless ISBN 1-58445-033-9 [includes fiction and non-fiction]
- Digital McLuhan: A Guide to the Information Millennium (1999) Routledge ISBN 0-415-19251-X
- Realspace: The Fate of Physical Presence in the Digital Age, On and Off Planet (2003) Routledge ISBN 0-415-27743-4
- Cellphone: The Story of the World's Most Mobile Medium (2004) Palgrave Macmillan ISBN 1-4039-6041-0
- New New Media (2009/2012) Penguin/Pearson ISBN 0-205-67330-9; second, revised edition (2012) ISBN 0-205-86557-7
- The Essential Sopranos Reader ed. David Lavery, Douglas L. Howard, & Paul Levinson (2011) University of Kentucky Press ISBN 978-0-81313-012-5
- Touching the Face of the Cosmos: On the Intersection of Space Travel and Religion ed. Paul Levinson & Michael Waltemathe (2015/2016) Connected Editions/Fordham University Press ISBN 978-1-56178-042-6 [includes fiction and non-fiction]
