= Kogaku =

Kogaku may refer to:

- Kogaku, a Neo-Confucian school of thought in Japan, see kokugaku
- Kogaku, journal of the Optical Society of Japan
