= AHEP =

AHEP may refer to:

- Association of Higher Education Professionals, a professional body for higher education administrators and managers in the UK and Republic of Ireland
- Advances in High Energy Physics, a peer-reviewed, open-access scientific journal published by Hindawi

== See also ==
- American Hellenic Educational Progressive Association, a fraternal organisation based in Atlanta, Georgia
- AHEPA University Hospital, a hospital in Thessaloniki, Greece
- Ahepe, a village in the southeast of Togo
