= New Astronomy =

New Astronomy may refer to:

- Astronomia nova (Latin for 'New Astronomy'), a 1609 book by Johannes Kepler
- New Astronomy (journal), a scientific journal
