= Supawan Tantayanon =

Thai chemist (born 1951)

- Education: Worcester Polytechnic Institute; Chulalongkorn University
- Scientific career
- Workplaces: Chulalongkorn University
- Thesis: Photocatalytic oxidations of lactams and N-acylamines. (1982)

Supawan Tantayanon (Thai: ศุภวรรณ ตันตยานนท์, RTGS: Suphawan Tantayanon; born November 3, 1951) is a Thai chemist who is a professor at the Chulalongkorn University. She has previously served as President of the Science Society of Thailand, Council of Science and Technology Professionals of Thailand, and Federation of Asian Chemical Societies.

== Early life and education ==
After completing high school, Tantayanon was made to choose whether to study science or non-science majors. Tantayanon was an undergraduate student at Chulalongkorn University, where she studied chemistry. She moved to Mahidol University for her master's degree, where she started specialising in organic chemistry. Tantayanon joined the Worcester Polytechnic Institute, where she studied photocatalytic oxidation of N-acylamines supported by a Fulbright Program scholarship.

== Research and career ==
In 1985, Tantayanon was appointed to faculty at Chulalongkorn University. That year, the Thai government installed the country's first petrochemical complex, and she was responsible for teaching a master's program in petrochemistry. She was appointed Director of the Petroleum and Petrochemical College, and initiated the program's collaborations with industry. She was made a professor at Chulalongkorn University in 2012. Her research considers green chemistry and sustainability.

Tantayanon worked on the development of sustainable chemistry laboratories and chemistry education. She launched a multi-university initiative to eliminate dangerous chemistry in laboratories. She launched an innovation-focused graduate program for chemistry students in Thailand, which was delivered in English.

== Awards and honours ==
- 2019 Mahidol University Outstanding Alumnus of Graduate School
- 2021 Services to Chemistry Education
- 2021 IUPAC Distinguished Women in Chemistry

== Selected publications ==
- Warayuth Sajomsang; Supawan Tantayanon; Varawut Tangpasuthadol; William H Daly (30 September 2009). "Quaternization of N-aryl chitosan derivatives: synthesis, characterization, and antibacterial activity". Carbohydrate Research. 344 (18): 2502–2511. doi:10.1016/j.carres.2009.09.004. ISSN 0008-6215. PMID 19863950. Wikidata Q43253341.
- Warayuth Sajomsang; Pattarapond Gonil; Supawan Tantayanon (24 March 2009). "Antibacterial activity of quaternary ammonium chitosan containing mono or disaccharide moieties: preparation and characterization". International Journal of Biological Macromolecules. 44 (5): 419–427. doi:10.1016/j.ijbiomac.2009.03.003. ISSN 0141-8130. PMID 19428476. Wikidata Q33442470.
- Warayuth Sajomsang; Pattarapond Gonil; Supawan Tantayanon (24 March 2009). "Antibacterial activity of quaternary ammonium chitosan containing mono or disaccharide moieties: preparation and characterization". International Journal of Biological Macromolecules. 44 (5): 419–427. doi:10.1016/j.ijbiomac.2009.03.003. ISSN 0141-8130. PMID 19428476. Wikidata Q33442470.
