= Bob Mann =

Bob, Bobby or Robert Mann may refer to:

== Sports ==
- Bob Mann (American football) (1924–2006), American football player
- Bob Mann (golfer) (born 1951), American golfer
- Bobby Mann (born 1974), Scottish footballer

== Others ==
- Bob Mann (Canadian politician), Ontario Communist Party candidate
- Bob Mann (guitarist) (born 1944), American guitarist/keyboardist
- Robert Mann (1920–2018), musician
- Robert Mann (Royal Navy officer) (1748–1813), British admiral
- Robert James Mann (1817–1886), English physician and science writer
- Robert Trask Mann (1924–2002), American judge and politician in the Florida House of Representatives
- Robert Wellesley Mann (1924–2006), pioneer in the field of medical prosthetics
- Robert E. Mann, member of the Illinois House of Representatives
- Robert Mann (physicist), Canadian physicist
