= Lars Samuelson =

Lars Samuelson may refer to:

- Lars Samuelson (musician), Swedish musician and music arranger
- Lars Samuelson (physicist), Swedish physicist
