= Physical Society of Japan =

The Physical Society of Japan (JPS; 日本物理学会 in Japanese) is the organisation of physicists in Japan. There are about 16,000 members, including university professors, researchers as well as educators, and engineers.

The origins of the JPS go back to the establishment of the Tokyo Mathematical Society in 1877, as the first society in natural science in Japan. After being renamed twice, as Tokyo Mathematical and Physical Society in 1884 and as Physico-Mathematical Society of Japan in 1919, it eventually separated into two in 1946, and the Physical Society of Japan was formed. Takeo Shimizu (清水武雄), a contributor to the improvements to the Wilson cloud chamber and the last President of the Physico-Mathematical Society, was also the first president of JPS.

== Purpose ==
The primary purposes of the JPS are to publish research reports of its members and to provide its members with facilities relating to physics.

== Reciprocal agreements ==
The JPS has established reciprocal agreements with seven physical societies such as the American Physical Society, German Physical Society, Mexican Physical Society and Korean Physical Society so that the members of one society can participate in the activities of the other on an equal partner basis.

== Publications ==
- Journal of the Physical Society of Japan
- Progress of Theoretical Physics

== See also ==
- Applied Physics Express
- Japan Society of Applied Physics
- Optical Review
- Optical Society of Japan
- Mathematical Society of Japan
