= Journal of the Korean Physical Society =

- Discipline: Physics
- Language: English
- Edited by: Kong-Ju-Bock Lee

Publication details
- History: 1968-present
- Publisher: Springer Science+Business Media (South Korea)
- Frequency: Biweekly
- Open access: Delayed
- Impact factor: 0.418 (2014)

Standard abbreviations
- ISO 4: J. Korean Phys. Soc.

Indexing
- CODEN: JKPSDV
- ISSN: 0374-4884 (print); 1976-8524 (web)
- LCCN: 70273968
- OCLC no.: 749258929

Links
- Journal homepage; Online access (by Springer since 2012); Online archive (1968-2011)

The Journal of the Korean Physical Society is a peer-reviewed scientific journal published by Springer Science+Business Media on behalf of the Korean Physical Society. The journal publishes 24 issues per year and past issues from 1968 to 2011 are available as open access. The editor-in-chief is Kong-Ju-Bock Lee. The journal covers original research in all areas of physics. For example, coverage encompasses statistical physics, condensed matter physics and particle physics. Publishing formats include regular full papers, letters, and brief sections. Editors choose featured articles for the journal.

== Abstracting and indexing ==
- Science Citation Index
- Scopus
- Astrophysics Data System
- Current Contents/Physical, Chemical and Earth Sciences
- GeoRef
- INIS Atomindex

== See also ==
- List of physics journals
- Journal of the Korean Astronomical Society
