= Publications of the Astronomical Society of Japan =

- Discipline: Astronomy
- Language: English
- Edited by: M. Ando

Publication details
- History: 1949–present
- Publisher: Astronomical Society of Japan (Japan)
- Frequency: Bimonthly
- Impact factor: 3.310 (2021)

Standard abbreviations
- ISO 4: Publ. Astron. Soc. Jpn.

Indexing
- CODEN: PASJAC
- ISSN: 0004-6264
- LCCN: 59045041
- OCLC no.: 01518489

Links
- Journal homepage; Online access

Publications of the Astronomical Society of Japan (PASJ) is a peer-reviewed scientific journal of astronomy published by the Astronomical Society of Japan on a bimonthly basis. The journal was established in 1949. The current editor-in-chief is M. Ando.

== See also ==
- List of astronomy journals
