= Journal of Magnetism and Magnetic Materials =

- Discipline: Magnetism, magnetic materials
- Language: English
- Edited by: S. D. Bader

Publication details
- History: 1975–present
- Publisher: North Holland (Elsevier)
- Frequency: Biweekly
- Impact factor: 2.5 (2023)

Standard abbreviations
- ISO 4: J. Magn. Magn. Mater.

Indexing
- CODEN: JMMMDC
- ISSN: 0304-8853 (print); 1873-4766 (web)
- LCCN: 76643595
- OCLC no.: 2322040

Links
- Journal homepage; Online access

The Journal of Magnetism and Magnetic Materials is a peer-reviewed scientific journal that covers both basic research on magnetism and technological applications including magnetic recording. In addition to full-length research articles, it publishes review articles and rapid communications ("Letters to the Editor"). A special section, "Information Storage: Basic and Applied", covers topics on magnetic media. The editor-in-chief is S. D. Bader (Argonne National Laboratory).

== Abstracting and indexing ==
The journal is abstracted and indexed in over forty databases, including Current Contents/Physics, Chemical, & Earth Sciences, Compendex, Inspec, CSA/ASCE Civil Engineering Abstracts, and Scopus.

== Notable articles ==
According to the Journal Citation Reports, the journal has a 2017 impact factor of 3.046, ranking it 22nd out of 67 journals in the category "Physics, Condensed Matter" and 82nd out of 285 journals in the category "Materials Science, Multidisciplinary".

In June 2017, the three most highly cited articles were:

- Nogués, J; Schuller, Ivan K (February 1999). "Exchange bias". Journal of Magnetism and Magnetic Materials. 192 (2): 203–232. Bibcode:1999JMMM..192..203N. doi:10.1016/S0304-8853(98)00266-2.っっっghんhじううじいkhmっこ
- Berkowitz, A.E.; Takano, Kentaro (October 1999). "Exchange anisotropy — a review". Journal of Magnetism and Magnetic Materials. 200 (1–3): 552–570. Bibcode:1999JMMM..200..552B. doi:10.1016/S0304-8853(99)00453-9.
- Kodama, R.H. (October 1999). "Magnetic nanoparticles". Journal of Magnetism and Magnetic Materials. 200 (1–3): 359–372. Bibcode:1999JMMM..200..359K. doi:10.1016/S0304-8853(99)00347-9.

== See also ==
- List of scientific journals in physics
