= Journal of the Physical Society of Japan =

- Discipline: All fields of physics
- Language: English
- Edited by: A. Kawabata

Publication details
- Former name: Proceedings of the Physico-Mathematical Society of Japan
- History: 1946 to present
- Publisher: The Physical Society of Japan (JPS) (Japan)
- Frequency: monthly
- Open access: some
- Impact factor: 1.5 (2023)

Standard abbreviations
- ISO 4: J. Phys. Soc. Jpn.

Indexing
- CODEN: JUPSAU
- ISSN: 0031-9015 (print); 1347-4073 (web)
- LCCN: 50013353
- OCLC no.: 1762332

Links
- Journal homepage

Journal of the Physical Society of Japan (JPSJ) is a monthly, peer-reviewed, scientific journal published by the Physical Society of Japan (JPS). It was first published in July 1946 (volume 1). The editor-in-chief was A. Kawabata until August 2010. The impact factor for JPSJ in 2017 is 1.485, according to Journal Citation Reports.

Volume 1 consists of a single issue designated, on the cover, from July to December 1946. Between 1967 and 1980, this journal published at a rate of two volumes per year. The other (Japanese) title for this journal is Nihon Butsuri Gakkai ōji hōkoku. Volumes for 1967 to the present day are accompanied by an annual supplement.

Research paper formats include full papers, letters, short notes, comments, addenda, errata, invited papers and special topics.

== Organizational structure ==
The organizational structure of the journal is described as follows:

The Full Papers, Letters and Short Notes sections of the journal comprise the published original research results. Furthermore, the Full Papers section is intended to be self-contained, original research papers. The Short Notes are brief reporting on recent breakthroughs. Finally, invited reviews from a notable researcher in the field, and a collection of relevant subjects under Special Topics are occasionally included for publication.

All articles are published online in advance, before they are printed on paper. The online version of JPSJ is updated twice a month (on the 10th and 25th). The paper version of JPSJ is printed once per month (on the 15th). This version comprises the two groups of articles that are published online on two different dates.

== Overview ==
The journal was established in 1946, succeeding its predecessor publication, Proceedings of the Physico-Mathematical Society of Japan. In its present state, JPSJ is an international journal, with submissions from authors worldwide. Additionally, financial support is available to those authors in need from developing countries.

The online version has allowed for notable extra information to be available. Certain significant works are selected and emphasized on the journals' homepage. In the News and Comments column the background and impact of selected researchers are discussed by those who are described as experts, which indirectly provides the added dimension of relevant information about recent developments in physics.

== Scope ==
The main focus of JPSJ is all topics related to physics. This includes pure and applied physics research topics which encompass core physics disciplines, and broad topical coverage that is related to these core disciplines. Hence, subject areas cover an exploration and investigation of nature and substances that exist in the world and the universe, from atomic to cosmological scales. This encompasses defining and describing observations, interactions, and forces which occur in nature and, hence, in substances. Such descriptions may include their effect on, or within, a given natural system. More broadly, it is the general analysis of nature, conducted in order to understand how the universe behaves. Therefore, subject areas encompass energy, forces, mechanics, radiation, heat, matter, electromagnetism, quantum mechanics and general theory of relativity.

== Previous and current IF ==
Thomson Reuters, Journal Citation Reports rated JPSJ with an impact factor of 2.212 in 2008, and an impact factor of 2.572 in 2009.

== Abstracting and indexing ==
Journal of the Physical Society of Japan is indexed in the following bibliographic databases:

- Chemical Abstracts 0009-2258
- Chemical Abstracts Service -CASSI
- Current Contents - Physical, Chemical & Earth Sciences
- Science Citation Index
- Science Citation Index Expanded

== See also ==
- American Journal of Physics
- Annales Henri Poincaré
- Applied Physics Express
- CRC Handbook of Chemistry and Physics
- European Physical Journal E: Soft Matter and Biological Physics
- Journal of Physics A: Mathematical and Theoretical
- Journal of Physical and Chemical Reference Data
- Physical Review E: Statistical, Nonlinear, and Soft Matter Physics
- Physics Today
