= Optical Review =

- Discipline: Optical science, optical engineering
- Language: English
- Edited by: Masahiro Yamaguchi

Publication details
- History: 1994-present
- Publisher: Springer Science+Business Media
- Frequency: Bimonthly
- Impact factor: 0.9 (2024)

Standard abbreviations
- ISO 4: Opt. Rev.

Indexing
- CODEN: OPREFN
- ISSN: 1340-6000 (print); 1349-9432 (web)
- OCLC no.: 53863964

Links
- Journal homepage; Online access

Optical Review is a bimonthly peer-reviewed scientific journal that was established in 1994 and is published by Springer Science+Business Media in partnership with the Optical Society of Japan. The editor-in-chief is Masahiro Yamaguchi. The journal publishes research and review papers in all subdisciplines of optical science and optical engineering.

Subdisciplines include general and physical optics, spectroscopy, quantum optics, optical computing, photonics, optoelectronics, lasers, nonlinear optics, environmental optics, adaptive optics, and space optics. Optics regarding the visible spectrum, infrared, and short wavelength optics are also included. Coverage encompasses required materials as well as suitable manufacturing tools, technologies, and methodologies.

== Abstracting and indexing ==
The journal is abstracted and/or indexed in:

- Science Citation Index Expanded
- Current Contents/ Physical, Chemical & Earth Sciences
- Current Contents/Engineering, Computing & Technology
- Academic OneFile
- Academic Search
- Astrophysics Data System
- Chemical Abstracts Service
- Inspec
- PASCAL
- Scopus
- TOC Premier
- VINITI Database RAS

According to the Journal Citation Reports, the journal has a 2024 impact factor of 0.9.

== See also ==
- Applied Physics Express
- Japanese Journal of Applied Physics
