= Sponsoring Consortium for Open Access Publishing in Particle Physics =

International collaboration

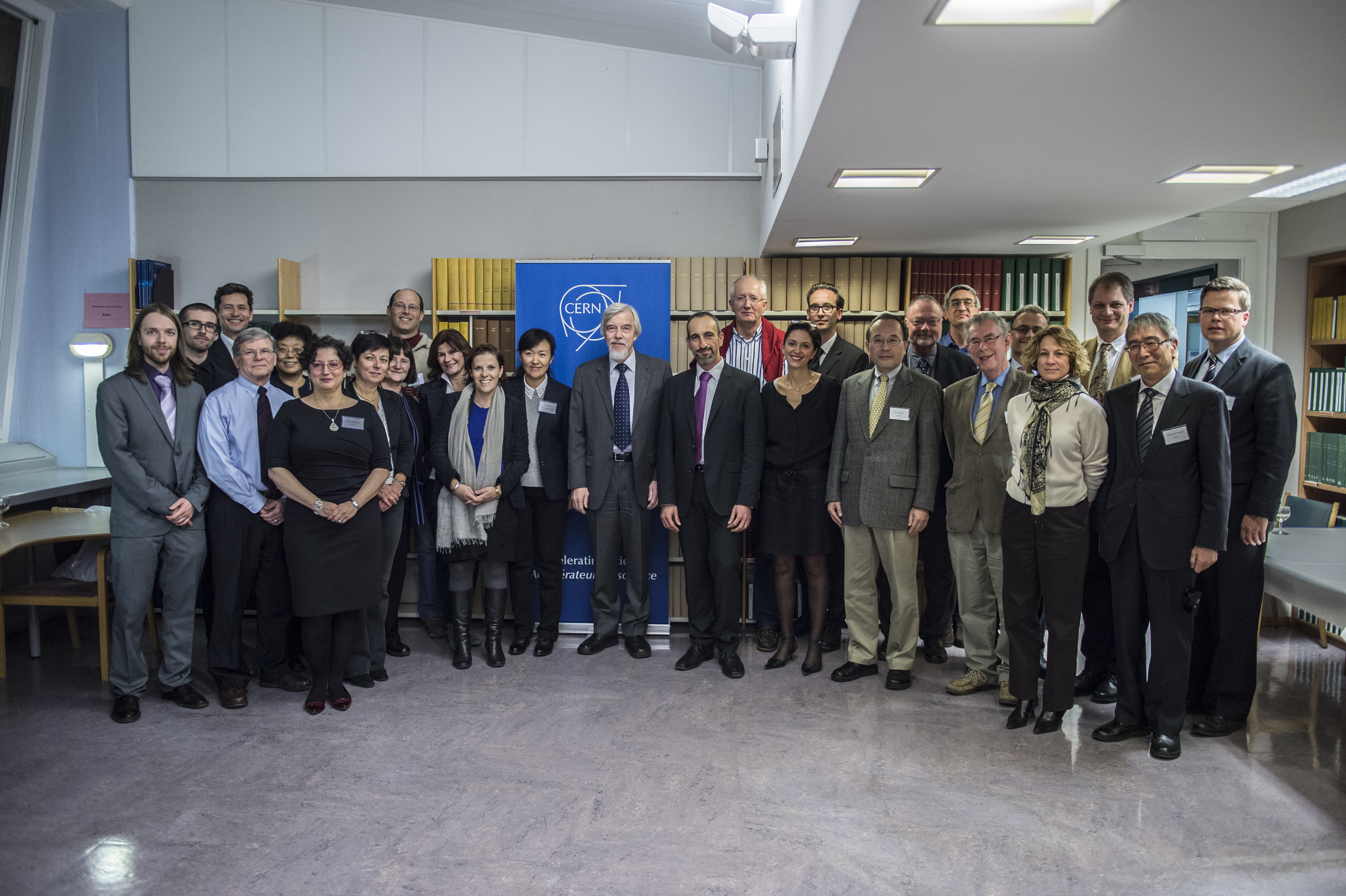
SCOAP3 partners meeting at CERN 4 December 2013

The Sponsoring Consortium for Open Access Publishing in Particle Physics (or SCOAP^{3}) is an international collaboration in the high-energy physics community to convert traditional closed access physics journals to open access, freely available for everyone to read and reuse, shifting away the burden of the publishing cost from readers (traditional model) and authors (in the case of hybrid open access journals). Under the terms of the agreement, authors retain copyrights and the articles published under SCOAP^{3} will be in perpetuity under a CC BY license. The initiative was promoted by CERN in collaboration with international partners.

Participating countries in the agreement sponsor SCOAP^{3} journals through the consortium, and contribute according to their scientific output. More productive countries pay more, while lower-output countries pay less.

== Participating journals ==
SCOAP^{3} supports journals mostly publishing High-Energy Physics content fully, and those articles in other journals that have been submitted by their authors to a High-Energy Physics category on arXiv.org. Each year more than 4,000 articles are published in open access as part of the initiative.

In 2012, SCOAP^{3} reached agreements with 12 subscription journals to make their articles openly accessible. This agreement would cover 90% of all published particle physics articles from 2014 onwards. Of the original 12 journals, two journals pulled out of the agreement: Physical Review C and Physical Review D. On April 19, 2016, SCOAP3 announced the extension of the initiative until 2019 with 8 journals participating. From 2018 on also APS joined with three journals to a total of 11 supported journals at the moment.

The following journals participate currently, or have participated in the first phase of the consortia:

journal	journal abbreviation	publisher	phase I participation	phase II participation	phase III participation
Acta Physica Polonica B	APPB	Jagiellonian University, Polish Academy of Arts and Sciences	2014 - 2016	2017 - 2019	2020 -
Advances in High Energy Physics	AHEP	Hindawi	2014 -2016	2017 -2019	2020 -
Chinese Physics C	CPC	Science Press, IOP Publishing	2014 -2016	2017 -2019	2020 -
European Physical Journal C	EPJC	Springer	2014 -2016	2017 -2019	2020 -
Journal of Cosmology and Astroparticle Physics	JCAP	IOP Publishing	2014 -2016		
Journal of High Energy Physics	JHEP	Springer	2014 -2016	2017 -2019	2020 -
New Journal of Physics	NJP	IOP Publishing	2014 -2016		
Nuclear Physics B	NPB	Elsevier	2014 -2016	2017 -2019	2020 -
Physics Letters B	PLB	Elsevier	2014 -2016	2017 -2019	2020 -
Physical Review C	PRC	American Physical Society		2018 -2019	2020 -
Physical Review D	PRD	American Physical Society		2018 -2019	2020 -
Physical Review Letters	PRL	American Physical Society		2018 -2019	2020 -
Progress of Theoretical and Experimental Physics	PTEP	Oxford University Press	2014 -2016	2017 -2019	2020 -

== Book programme ==
In 2022 SCOAP^{3} entered into partnerships with leading academic publishers, including Cambridge University Press, Oxford University Press, Springer Nature, Taylor & Francis, and World Scientific, to make over 100 textbooks available open access.

== Members ==
Countries are usually represented by one or few library consortia, funding agencies or research organizations that act as a coordinator for the country. Currently, 44 countries as well as 3 intergovernmental organisations (CERN, IAEA, JINR) are members of the consortium.
