= Journal of the Korean Astronomical Society =

- Discipline: Astronomy, astrophysics
- Language: English
- Edited by: Sungsoo S. Kim

Publication details
- History: 1968–present
- Publisher: Korean Astronomical Society (South Korea)
- Frequency: Bimonthly
- Open access: Yes
- Impact factor: 1.545 (2017)

Standard abbreviations
- ISO 4: J. Korean Astron. Soc.

Indexing
- CODEN: CHACDE
- ISSN: 1225-4614
- OCLC no.: 177331415

Links
- Journal homepage; Online archive

The Journal of the Korean Astronomical Society is a bimonthly open access peer-reviewed scientific journal of astronomy published by the Korean Astronomical Society. It covers original work and review articles from all branches of astronomy and astrophysics. The journal was established in 1968 and the editor-in-chief is Sungsoo S. Kim.

== Abstracting and indexing ==
The journal is abstracted and indexed in:

- Astrophysics Data System
- Current Contents/Physical, Chemical & Earth Sciences
- Inspec
- Science Citation Index Expanded
- Scopus
- SIMBAD

According to the Journal Citation Reports, the journal has a 2017 impact factor of 1.545.

== See also ==
- List of astronomy journals
- List of physics journals
- Journal of the Korean Physical Society
