= Advances in Physics =

- Discipline: Condensed matter physics, general physics, materials science
- Language: English
- Edited by: Paolo Radaelli and Joerg Schmalian

Publication details
- History: 1952–present
- Publisher: Taylor & Francis
- Frequency: Bimonthly
- Impact factor: 23.750 (2021)

Standard abbreviations
- ISO 4: Adv. Phys.

Indexing
- CODEN: ADPHAH
- ISSN: 0001-8732 (print); 1460-6976 (web)
- LCCN: 53033843
- OCLC no.: 1461245

Links
- Journal homepage

Advances in Physics is a bimonthly scientific journal published by Taylor & Francis that was established in 1952. The journal is also issued as a supplement to the Philosophical Magazine. Peer review is determined on a case-by-case basis. The editors-in-chief are Paolo Radaelli and Joerg Schmalian.

The frequency of this publication varied from 1952 until 2007, when it became a bimonthly journal.

== Aims and scope ==
The focus of the journal is critical reviews that are relevant to condensed matter physicists. Each review is intended to present the author's perspective. Readers are expected to have a fundamental knowledge of the subject. These reviews are sometimes complemented by a "Perspectives" section which publishes shorter articles that may be controversial, with the intention of stimulating debate. The intended audience consists of physicists, materials scientists, and physical chemists working in universities, industry, and research institutes.

Broad, interdisciplinary coverage includes topics ranging from condensed matter physics, statistical mechanics, quantum information, cold atoms, and soft matter physics to biophysics.

== Impact factor and ranking ==
The impact factor for Advances in Physics 23.750 in 2021.

== Abstracting and indexing ==
This journal is indexed in the following databases:

- Science Citation Index
- Inspec
- Engineering Information
- Chemical Abstracts Service/CASSI
- EBSCO Publishing
- International Bibliography of the Social Sciences
- Cambridge Scientific Abstracts
- Astrophysics Data System
- International Aerospace Abstracts
- SciBase
- Scopus
- Nuclear Science Abstracts

== See also ==
- List of physics journals
