= Lars Samuelson (physicist) =

Swedish physicist

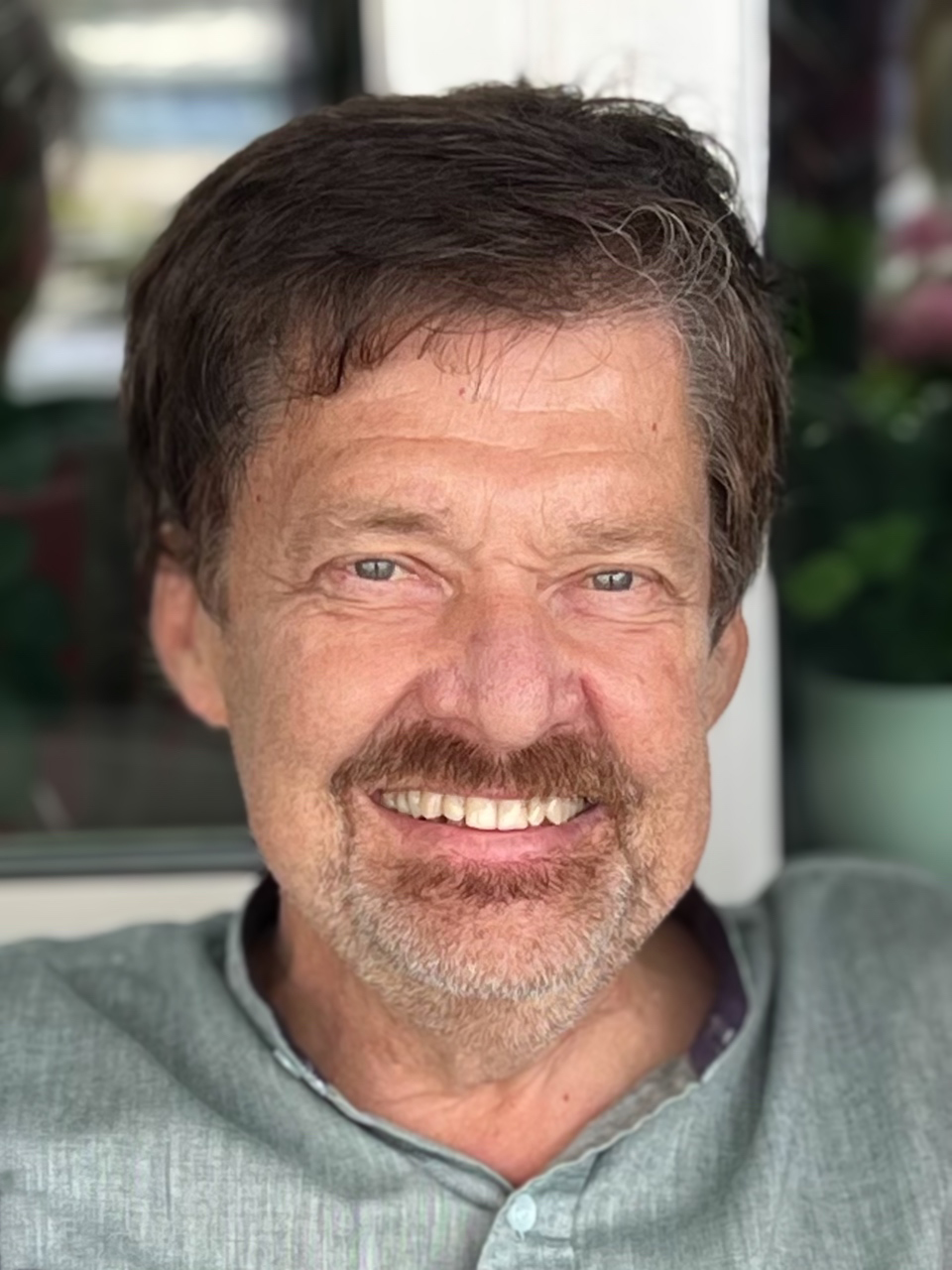
- Samuelson in 2011
- Born: 20 December 1948 (age 77); Malmö, Sweden
- Education: Lund University
- Known for: Nanowires
- Awards: Fellow of the Institute of Physics (FInstP) (2004); Elected as Einstein Professor by the Chinese Academy of Sciences (CAS) (2008); Fellow of the American Physical Society (Materials Physics) (2009); Ideon Prize for Innovation (2011); IUVSTA Prize for Science for the Triennium 2010-2013 (2013); Fred Kavli Distinguished Lectureship in Nanoscience (2014); Wilhelm Westrup's prize (2018); Fellow International of the Japanese Society for Applied Physics (2020); Royal Swedish Academy of Engineering Sciences
- Scientific career
- Fields: Physics
- Workplaces: University of Lund
- Thesis: Optical properties of the deep impurity oxygen in gallium phosphide (1977)

Lars Ivar Samuelson (born 20 December 1948) is a Swedish physicist and professor in nanotechnology and semiconductor electronics at Lund University.

== Biography ==
In 1977 Lars Samuelson received his PhD in physics at Lund University. Afterwards he went for post-doc at the IBM Research Center in San Jose, California between 1978 and 1979, researching display technology and band structure calculations.

In 1981 he became an associate professor (Docent) of physics at Lund University, after which he in 1986 became a professor of semiconductor physics at Chalmers University of Technology/University of Gothenburg.

In 1988 he became a professor of semiconductor electronics at the Department of Physics at Lund University, and in the same year initiated the creation of Scandinavia's first Nanoscience research center, Nanometer structure consortium (nmC), later re-named NanoLund. In 2000 he began to focus the Nanometer structure consortium's research on Nanowires.

In 2004, he and his team became one of the first in the world to show how it is possible to combine substances with different structural, electrical and optical properties in a nanowire, allowing basic physics and novel devices to be realized.

Since 2021, he is employed as a professor at Southern University of Science and Technology in Shenzhen, leading the Institute of Nanoscience and Applications (INA).

Lars Samuelson was awarded the IVA's Great Gold Medal in 2022 for his world-leading research in nanotechnology.

He was elected a Foreign Member of the Chinese Academy of Sciences (CAS) (Class of Mathematics and Physics) in 2023.

Lars Samuelson became a member of the Royal Physiographic Society in 1998, the Royal Swedish Academy of Sciences (Physics) in 2006 and The Royal Swedish Academy of Engineering Sciences in 2007. He became Fellow of the Institute of Physics in 2004, appointed Einstein Professor of the Chinese Academy of Sciences in 2008, American Physical Society Fellow in 2009 and fellow international at Japan Society of Applied Physics in 2020.

Samuelson is the author of well over 700 articles with h-index 91 by Web-of-Science (h-index 112 by Google Scholar), listed in the top 1% highly cited researchers by Web-of-Science and has given more than 300 plenary/invited talks at international conferences.

He is ranked third on the journal Nano Letters list of the most productive researchers in nanosciences in the years 2001–2009.

He is the Founder of four start-up companies coming out of Lund University, QuNano AB, Sol Voltaics AB, Glo AB and Hexagem AB, engaged in commercialization of nanomaterials technologies.
