= Michael Dopita =

Australian astronomer

Michael Dopita AM FAA
- Born: Michael Andrew Dopita; 28 October 1946; Kraslice, Czechoslovakia
- Died: 22 December 2018 (aged 72); Canberra, Australian Capital Territory, Australia
- Occupation: Astronomer

Michael Andrew "Mike" Dopita (28 October 1946 – 22 December 2018) was an Australian astronomer.

== Education and career ==
Dopita studied physics at Wadham College, Oxford. He worked at the Australian National University from 1975, most recently as Professor Emeritus at the Research School of Astronomy and Astrophysics. He served as Treasurer of the Australian Academy of Science from 2008 and was a member of its Council from 2004 to 2008. He was president, Division VI, International Astronomical Union, from 1994 to 1997 and was a council member of the Astronomical Society of Australia between 1993 and 1996. He was an Inaugural Federation Fellow of the Australian Research Council, 2001.

Until 2015 he was editor in chief of the scientific journal Astrophysics and Space Science and author with Dr Ralph Sutherland of Astrophysics of the Diffuse Universe.

Dopita published over 650 research papers in refereed scientific journals.

== Awards and recognition ==
Dopita was the 1983 winner of the Pawsey Medal. He was elected Fellow of the Australian Academy of Science in 1996. He was appointed a Member of the Order of Australia (AM) in the 2013 Australia Day Honours.

== See also ==
- Eurasian Astronomical Society
