= Physics Letters =

- Discipline: Physics
- Language: English
- Edited by: VM Agranovich, AR Bishop, et al.

Publication details
- Publisher: Elsevier (Netherlands)
- Frequency: 48/year
- Impact factor: 2.7 (A), 5.0 (B) (2025)

Standard abbreviations
- ISO 4: Phys. Lett.

Indexing
- Physics Letters A
- CODEN: PYLAAG
- ISSN: 0375-9601
- Physics Letters B
- CODEN: PYLBAJ
- ISSN: 0370-2693

Links
- Journal homepage

Physics Letters was a scientific journal published from 1962 to 1966, when it split in two series now published by Elsevier:

- Physics Letters A: condensed matter physics, theoretical physics, nonlinear science, statistical physics, mathematical and computational physics, general and cross-disciplinary physics (including foundations), atomic, molecular and cluster physics, plasma and fluid physics, optical physics, biological physics and nanoscience.
- Physics Letters B: nuclear physics, theoretical nuclear physics, experimental high-energy physics, theoretical high-energy physics, and astrophysics.

Physics Letters B is part of the SCOAP^{3} initiative.

== See also ==
- List of periodicals published by Elsevier
