= Atomization and Sprays =

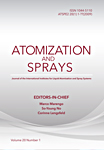
- Discipline: Fluid Mechanics, Engineering
- Language: English

Publication details
- History: 1991-present
- Publisher: Begell House
- Frequency: Monthly
- Impact factor: 1.737 (2020)

Standard abbreviations
- ISO 4: At. Sprays

Indexing
- ISSN: 1044-5110

Links
- Journal homepage

Atomization and Sprays is an international peer-reviewed scientific journal published monthly by Begell House. Founded by Norman Chigier in 1991, it presents original archival-quality research on the physical structure of liquids undergoing breakup and on their interaction with gaseous flow and solid surfaces. Currently it is the only journal that focuses exclusively on atomization and sprays, covering work on theoretical, computational and experimental aspects of the subject.

The journal is the integral hub for a community of industrialists, researchers, academics and students engaged in professional activities related to the spraying of liquids. Members of this community meet regularly around the world at conferences organised by The Institute for Liquid Atomization and Spray Systems (ILASS), which comprises ILASS-America, ILASS-Europe, ILASS-Japan, ILASS-Korea and ILASS-Taiwan.

The editor-in-chief is Editor-in-Chief Europe: GÜNTER BRENN, Editor-in-Chief Americas: Marcus Herrmann for America, and Editor-in-Chief Asia: David Hung.

According to Web of Science, the 2024 impact factor is 1.1.
