= Institute of Applied Physics, National Academy of Sciences of Ukraine =

Ukrainian research institute

Coordinates: 50.90555°N 34.79479°E

The Institute of Applied Physics, National Academy of Sciences of Ukraine, was established by the Decree of the Presidium of NAS Ukraine from 21.11.1991 No. 299 on the base of the Sumy branch of the Institute of Metallophysics to enlarge the fundamental and applied investigations in nuclear technology. The initiative belongs to Volodymyr Yu. Storizhko, the current director of the IAP NAS Ukraine, academician of NAS Ukraine and co-scholars from the National Scientific Center “Khar’kov Physical-Technical Institute”, NAS Ukraine. The idea of the first academic institute in Sumy region was industriously supported by B.Ye. Paton, the President of NAS Ukraine and V.G. Barjakhtar, the first Vice-President NAS Ukraine, academician of NAS Ukraine. The IAP NAS Ukraine is a part of the Department of Nuclear Physics and Power Engineering, NAS Ukraine.

== Main areas of research ==
- Experimental and theoretical studies of low-energy ion-, electron-, and photon interactions with matter, including biological materials;
- Design and construction of electrostatic accelerator-based instrumentation for analysis of material structure and composition with submicron lateral resolution;
- Development of nanotechnologies using focused charged-particle beams;
- Development of physical techniques for tracing small ore components and examining their rare-element microsystems.

== Scientific schools ==
- Basic and applied research into nuclear reactions at low energies (Volodymyr Yu. Storizhko, professor, academician of NAS Ukraine);
- Quantum electrodynamics (Petro I. Fomin, professor, corresponding member of NAS Ukraine);
- Charged particle physics (Valentin I. Myroshnichenko, corresponding member of NAS Ukraine);
- Mass spectrometry of biological objects (Leonid F. Sukhodub, professor, corresponding member of NAS Ukraine).
- Quantum electrodynamics in the external field (Sergey P. Roshchupkin, professor).
- Statistical physics (Alexandr I. Olemskoj, professor).

The investigations are being performed by 116 researchers including 1 academician of NAS Ukraine, 3 corresponding members of NAS Ukraine, 12 Doctors of Science and 36 PhDs.

== Structure of the Institute ==
- Department of electrostatic accelerators
- Department of biophysics and mass spectrometry
- Department of nuclear and physical research
- Department of theoretical science
- Interagency Department of Physical methods of ore analysis
- Research Center of Equipment for Education and Research

Much work is being done in skilled experts training. Together with Sumy Pedagogical Institute the IAP has established an IAP profile chair of advanced physical sciences for young skilled experts to be trained. A specialized Board of Studies on theses defence is created and the Interagency Board of Studies on Scientific Instrument Making led by academician V.Yu. Storizhko is working on the basis of the IAP.
