= Progress of Theoretical and Experimental Physics =

- Discipline: Theoretical physics
- Language: English
- Edited by: Tamiaki Yoneya

Publication details
- Former name: Progress of Theoretical Physics
- History: 1946–present
- Publisher: Oxford University Press on behalf of the Physical Society of Japan (Japan)
- Frequency: Monthly
- Open access: Yes
- Impact factor: 7.492 (2021)

Standard abbreviations
- ISO 4: Prog. Theor. Exp. Phys.

Indexing
- CODEN: PTPKAV
- ISSN: 0033-068X (print); 1347-4081 (web)
- OCLC no.: 2449902

Links
- Journal homepage; Online access

Progress of Theoretical and Experimental Physics is a monthly peer-reviewed scientific journal published by Oxford University Press on behalf of the Physical Society of Japan. It was established as Progress of Theoretical Physics in July 1946 by Hideki Yukawa and obtained its current name in January 2013.

The journal is part of the SCOAP^{3} initiative.
