= Modern Physics Letters A =

- Discipline: Physics
- Language: English

Publication details
- History: 1986–present
- Publisher: World Scientific (Singapore)
- Impact factor: 1.594 (2021)

Standard abbreviations
- ISO 4: Mod. Phys. Lett. A
- MathSciNet: Modern Phys. Lett. A

Indexing
- ISSN: 0217-7323 (print); 1793-6632 (web)

Links
- Journal homepage

Modern Physics Letters A (MPLA) is the first in a series of journals published by World Scientific under the title Modern Physics Letters. It covers specifically papers and research on gravitation, cosmology, nuclear physics, and particles and fields.

== Related journals ==
- Modern Physics Letters B
- International Journal of Modern Physics A
- International Journal of Modern Physics D
- International Journal of Modern Physics E

== Abstracting and indexing ==
According to the Journal Citation Reports, the journal had an impact factor of 1.594 for 2021. The journal is abstracted and indexed in:

- Science Citation Index
- SciSearch
- ISI Alerting Services
- Current Contents/Physical, Chemical & Earth Sciences
- Astrophysics Data System (ADS) Abstract Service
- Mathematical Reviews
- Inspec
- Zentralblatt MATH
