= Reviews of Geophysics =

- Discipline: Geophysics
- Language: English
- Edited by: Fabio Florindo

Publication details
- Former names: Reviews of Geophysics and Space Physics
- History: 1963–present
- Publisher: Wiley-Blackwell on behalf of the American Geophysical Union (United States)
- Frequency: Quarterly
- Impact factor: 25.2 (2023)

Standard abbreviations
- ISO 4: Rev. Geophys.

Indexing
- CODEN: REGEEP
- ISSN: 8755-1209 (print); 1944-9208 (web)
- LCCN: 86642786
- OCLC no.: 471534503

Links
- Journal homepage; Online access; Online archive

Reviews of Geophysics is a quarterly peer-reviewed scientific journal published by Wiley-Blackwell on behalf of the American Geophysical Union. The current editor-in-chief is Fabio Florindo (National Institute of Geophysics and Volcanology–Rome).

== History ==
Reviews of Geophysics (ISSN 0096-1043) was established in 1963. Between February 1970 and November 1984 it was named Reviews of Geophysics and Space Physics (ISSN 0034-6853). Throughout the years its frequency varied. It was quarterly in 1970–74, five per year in 1975, quarterly again in 1976–78, eight issues in 1979, quarterly in 1980–82, and finally eight issues in 1983, before being renamed to Reviews of Geophysics in 1984.

== Aims and scope ==
As a review publication by invitation only, Reviews of Geophysics provides an overview of geophysics research. It integrates summations of previous scientific investigations with active research areas. Critical analysis of the progress in, and direction of, geophysics is provided. Topical coverage includes solid-earth geophysics, cryospheric science, oceans and atmospheric studies, meteorology, and oceanography), along with the physics of the Solar System and its processes. For example, coverage includes processes that tend to concern the public such as rainfall rates, trends in marine fisheries, earthquake probabilities, and volcanic eruption potentials.

== Notable articles ==
The three most highly cited articles published in Reviews of Geophysics are:

Mellor, G. L.; Yamada, T. (1982). "Development of a turbulence closure-model for geophysical fluid problems". Reviews of Geophysics. 20 (4): 851–875. Bibcode:1982RvGSP..20..851M. doi:10.1029/RG020i004p00851.

Farr, Tom G.; Rosen, Paul A.; Caro, Edward; et al. (2007). "The shuttle radar topography mission". Reviews of Geophysics. https://doi.org/10.1029/2005RG000183.

Stuart Ross Taylor and Scott M. McLennan (1995). "The geochemical evolution of the continental crust". Reviews of Geophysics. https://doi.org/10.1029/95RG00262.

== Abstracting and indexing ==
The journal is abstracted and indexed in:

- Science Citation Index Expanded
- Current Contents/Physical, Chemical & Earth Sciences
- Chemical Abstracts
- Computer & Control Abstracts
- Electrical & Electronics Abstracts
- Physics Abstracts
- Energy Research Abstracts
- Engineering Index
- Excerpta Medica
- GeoRef
- GEOBASE
- International Aerospace Abstracts
- Mathematical Reviews
- SPIN
- Scopus
- PubMed

According to the Journal Citation Reports, the journal has a 2020 impact factor of 22.000.

== See also ==
- List of scientific journals in earth and atmospheric sciences
- List of scientific journals in physics
