= Biophysical Reviews and Letters =

- Discipline: Biophysics
- Language: English
- Edited by: Hans G. L. Coster, Zongchao Jia, Xiang-Yang Liu, Zhongcan Ouyang

Publication details
- History: 2006–present
- Publisher: World Scientific
- Frequency: Quarterly

Standard abbreviations
- ISO 4: Biophys. Rev. Lett.

Indexing
- CODEN: BRLIA7
- ISSN: 1793-0480 (print); 1793-7035 (web)
- LCCN: 2006202107
- OCLC no.: 302290849

Links
- Journal homepage; Online archive

Biophysical Reviews and Letters is a quarterly peer-reviewed scientific journal that covers the areas of experimental and mathematical biophysics, including, physical aspects of structural and molecular cell biology, bioenergetics, computational biophysics, bioinformatics, biofunctional and bioinspired materials, biomimetic materials, and fundamental issues related to life sciences. The journal occasionally publishes special issues on specific topics. It was established in 2006 and is published by World Scientific.

== Abstracting and indexing ==
The journal is abstracted and indexed in:

- BIOSIS Previews
- Chemical Abstracts Service
- EMBASE
- Inspec
- Scopus
