= Solar System Research =

- Discipline: Astronomy
- Language: English
- Edited by: Oleg I. Korablev

Publication details
- History: 1967–present (Russian); 2000–present (English)
- Publisher: Springer Science+Business Media
- Frequency: 8/year
- Impact factor: 0.706 (2020)

Standard abbreviations
- ISO 4: Sol. Syst. Res.

Indexing
- ISSN: 0038-0946 (print); 1608-3423 (web)

Links
- Journal homepage; Online archive

Solar System Research is a peer-reviewed scientific journal which focuses on objects in the Solar System. The journal is published by Nauka through Springer Science+Business Media. It is the English version of the Russian publication Astronomicheskii Vestnik (Астрономический вестник), which was first published in 1967. The English version started in 2000 with Volume 34.

== Abstracting and indexing ==
The journal is abstracted and indexed in the following databases:

- Academic OneFile
- Academic Search
- Astrophysics Data System
- CSA databases
- Chemical Abstracts Service
- Chemical and Earth Sciences
- Current Contents/Physical
- EBSCO databases
- INIS Atomindex
- Inspec
- International Bibliography of Periodical Literature
- Scopus
- Science Citation Index Expanded

According to Journal Citation Reports, the journal has a 2020 impact factor of 0.706.
