= Japanese Journal of Applied Physics =

- Discipline: Applied physics
- Language: English
- Edited by: Kouichi Ono, Masahiro Asada

Publication details
- History: 1962–present
- Publisher: Japan Society of Applied Physics, IOP Publishing (Japan)
- Frequency: Monthly
- Open access: Special issues available for one year after publication
- Impact factor: 1.7 (2025)

Standard abbreviations
- ISO 4: Jpn. J. Appl. Phys.

Indexing
- CODEN: JJAPB6
- ISSN: 0021-4922 (print); 1347-4065 (web)
- LCCN: 2008228761

Links
- Journal homepage

The Japanese Journal of Applied Physics (JJAP) is a peer-reviewed scientific journal that was established in 1962 and is published by the Japan Society of Applied Physics. From 1982 until 2008, the journal was published in two editions, Part 1 and Part 2:

- Part 1 was published monthly and was for regular papers, short notes and review papers.
- Part 2 was published semi-monthly and was for letters and express letters.

In 2008, Part 2 was separated as an independent journal and renamed Applied Physics Express. Part 1 continues to be published as the Japanese Journal of Applied Physics.

In June 2013, the Japan Society of Applied Physics signed an agreement with IOP Publishing for its journals to be published by IOP Publishing.

== See also ==
- Applied Physics Express
