= Modern Physics Letters B =

- Discipline: Physics
- Language: English

Publication details
- History: 1987–present
- Publisher: World Scientific
- Frequency: 32/year
- Impact factor: 1.668 (2020)

Standard abbreviations
- ISO 4: Mod. Phys. Lett. B
- MathSciNet: Modern Phys. Lett. B

Indexing
- ISSN: 0217-9849 (print); 1793-6640 (web)
- LCCN: 88640639
- OCLC no.: 49229274

Links
- Journal homepage; Online archive

Modern Physics Letters B is a peer-reviewed scientific journal on physics, especially the areas of condensed matter, statistical and applied physics, and high-Tc superconductivity. It was established in 1987 and is published by World Scientific.

== Related journals ==
- Modern Physics Letters A

== Abstracting and indexing ==
The journal is abstracted and indexed in:

- Science Citation Index
- Materials Science Citation Index
- Current Contents/Physical, Chemical & Earth Sciences
- Astrophysics Data System
- Mathematical Reviews
- Inspec
- CSA Meteorological & Geoastrophysical Abstracts
- Scopus

According to the Journal Citation Reports, the journal has a 2020 impact factor of 1.668.
