= Canadian Journal of Physics =

- Discipline: Physics
- Language: English
- Edited by: Robert Mann, Marco Merkli

Publication details
- Former name: Canadian Journal of Research. Section A: Physical Sciences
- History: 1929–present
- Publisher: NRC Research Press (Canada)
- Frequency: Monthly
- Open access: Hybrid
- Impact factor: 1.2 (2022)

Standard abbreviations
- ISO 4: Can. J. Phys.

Indexing
- CODEN: CJPHAD
- ISSN: 1208-6045 (print); 0008-4204 (web)
- LCCN: 53035015
- OCLC no.: 39083389

Links
- Journal homepage; Online access; Online archive

The Canadian Journal of Physics is a monthly peer-reviewed scientific journal covering research in physics. It was established in 1929 as the Canadian Journal of Research, Section A: Physical Sciences, obtaining its current title in 1951. The journal is published monthly by the NRC Research Press and edited by Robert Mann (University of Waterloo) and Marco Merkli (Memorial University of Newfoundland). The journal is affiliated with the Canadian Association of Physicists.

== Abstracting and indexing ==
The journal is abstracted and indexed in:

- Applied Science & Technology Abstracts
- Chemical Abstracts Service
- Current Contents
- Ei Compendex
- INIS Atomindex
- Inspec
- International Aerospace Abstracts
- Meteorological & Geoastrophysical Abstracts
- PASCAL
- Referativny Zhurnal
- Science Citation Index Expanded
- ZbMATH Open

According to the Journal Citation Reports, the journal has a 2022 impact factor of 1.2.
