= Masahiro Asada =

Japanese electrical engineer

- Occupation: Electrical engineer

Masahiro Asada from the Tokyo Institute of Technology, Tokyo, Japan was named Fellow of the Institute of Electrical and Electronics Engineers (IEEE) in 2012 for contributions to semiconductor laser theory and terahertz devices.
