= Korean Astronomical Society =

Non-profit organization in South Korea

- Abbreviation: KAS
- Formation: 21 March 1965; 60 years ago
- Type: Learned society
- President: Changbom Park
- Website: www.kas.org

The Korean Astronomical Society (Korean: 한국천문학회; Hanja: 韓國天文學會) is a non-profit learned society in South Korea that aims to supporting astronomical scholarship, technological development, education, and the spread of astronomical knowledge. It operates the Journal of the Korean Astronomical Society.

The KAS was founded on 21 March 1965, and presently has over 700 members. It holds meetings in spring and autumn of each year. The KAS is a member organisation of the International Astronomical Union, which it joined in 1973, and hosted the IAU Asia-Pacific Regional Meeting in 1996 and 2014. It also co-hosted the International Astronomy Olympiad in 2012.
