= Kenneth Chiacchia =

American writer

Kenneth "Ken" Chiacchia
- Born: December 29, 1961 (age 64); Hackensack, New Jersey
- Occupation: Writer
- Writing career
- Pen name: Ken
- Genres: Fantasy, science fiction

Kenneth Chiacchia (born December 29, 1961, in Hackensack, NJ) is an American writer in the fantasy and science fiction genre.

== Biography ==
Chiacchia was born in Hackensack, NJ. He earned a PhD in biochemistry, at the Harvard University Graduate School of Arts and Sciences in 1991. He has been published in four different genres: Science Fiction, Medical Writing, Search and Rescue Science, and Journalism. Ken began his career as a medical science writer at Harvard Medical School in 1993. Currently he is a medical science writer and editor at the University of Pittsburgh Medical Center. Chiacchia is a member of both the Science Fiction and Fantasy Writers of America and the National Association of Science Writers. He has been a news reporter for the Pittsburgh Post-Gazette's North Hills section with over 50 published stories. Ken had a recent story that was the cover page article for the Pittsburgh City Paper.

He is also a dog handler in Allegheny Mountain Rescue League, a Pittsburgh-based volunteer organization that assists authorities in civilian lost-person searches. His work has been noted in local newspapers. He has written on the science of olfaction for search and rescue workers. In 1993, Chiacchia joined the Pittsburgh Worldwrights Writers' Workshop founded by Pittsburgh science-fiction and fantasy writer Mary Soon Lee and continued by Pittsburgh author Barton Paul Levenson and others. Chiacchia won the 2008 Kamin Science Center Journalism Award.

== Bibliography ==
Fiction

- "A Matter of Gravity." The Martian Wave, March 2001....Reprinted in Wondrous Web Worlds 2 (anthology), June 2002.
- "Medical Command." Alternate Realities, July–August 2001.
- "Apology for a Red Planet." Neverworlds, October 2001.
- "A Technical Fix." Cicada, March–April 2002.
- "Epidemic." Ideomancer, July 2003.
- "Tribute." Oceans of the Mind, September 2003.
- "And Yet It Moves." Paradox, November 2003....to be reprinted in Cicada.
- "The Rescue Contract." Cicada, January–February 2004.
- "Resistance." Oceans of the Mind, January 2005.
- "Victim." From the Trenches anthology, November 2006.
- "House Trainer." The Hub, October 2007.
- "The Humanoid Element." Cicada, January–February 2008.
- "And Yet It Moves." Cicada, January–February 2009 pp. 13–17

Poems

- "Graveyard." The Pedestal, October 2004.
- "Victim." The Pedestal, October 2004.
- "Casualty." On Our Way to the Battle: Poetry from the Trenches (chapbook), November 2006....Reprinted in the Rhysling Anthology (Rhysling Award nominee), May 2007.

Awards

- 2008 Kamin Science Center Journalism Award.

== Reviews ==
- "House Trainer"
- "And Yet It Moves"
- "Victim"
- "Resistance"
- "Tribute"

== Non-Fiction ==
- "Replanting Cranberry The Pittsburgh region's poster child for sprawl is putting down new roots." Pittsburgh City Paper, December 3, 2009 (Cover Page)
- ”In Search of Human Scent.”
- "Who Goes There? The Body's System for Generating Individual Scent" Advanced Rescue Technology, June/July 2004, pp. 45–50.
- ”Getting it right: Evaluating standards and practices for future training.”
- "8 Things Hackers Hate About You:"
- "Brain Waves," University of Chicago Magazine, Nov./Dec. 2007.
- "Insanity Defense," Gale Encyclopedia of Psychology, 2nd ed. Gale Group, 2001.

== Scholarly Articles ==
- Chiacchia KB. Quantitation of the class I disulfides of the insulin receptor. [Journal Article. Research Support, U.S. Gov't, P.H.S.] Biochemical & Biophysical Research Communications. 176(3):1178–82, 1991 May 15. UI: 2039503
- Chiacchia KB. Reoxidation of the class I disulfides of the rat adipocyte insulin receptor is dependent upon the presence of insulin: the class I disulfide of the insulin receptor is extracellular. [In Vitro. Journal Article. Research Support, U.S. Gov't, P.H.S.] Biochemistry. 27(13):4894-902, 1988 Jun 28. UI: 3048393
- Chiacchia KB. Drickamer K. Direct evidence for the transmembrane orientation of the hepatic glycoprotein receptors. [Journal Article. Research Support, Non-U.S. Gov't. Research Support, U.S. Gov't, P.H.S.] Journal of Biological Chemistry. 259(24):15440-6, 1984 Dec 25. UI: 6150936
