= Geophysical & Astrophysical Fluid Dynamics =

- Discipline: Astrophysics; Fluid mechanics Geophysics
- Language: English
- Edited by: Marcel Oliver

Publication details
- Former name(s): Geophysical Fluid Dynamics
- History: 1970–present
- Publisher: Taylor & Francis
- Frequency: Bimonthly
- Impact factor: 1.451 (2020)

Standard abbreviations
- ISO 4: Geophys. Astrophys. Fluid Dyn.

Indexing
- ISSN: 0309-1929 (print); 1029-0419 (web)
- LCCN: 78640730
- OCLC no.: 300220663

Links
- Journal homepage; Online access; Online archive

Geophysical & Astrophysical Fluid Dynamics is a bimonthly peer-reviewed scientific journal covering applications of fluid dynamics in the fields of astrophysics and geophysics. It was established in 1970 as Geophysical Fluid Dynamics, obtaining its current name in 1977. It is published by Taylor & Francis. According to the Journal Citation Reports, the journal has a 2020 impact factor of 1.451.
