= International Journal of Quantum Information =

- Discipline: Physics
- Language: English
- Edited by: Berthold-Georg Englert, Marco Genovese, Daniel Greenberger, Guang-Can Guo

Publication details
- History: 2003-present
- Publisher: World Scientific
- Impact factor: 0.979 (2021)

Standard abbreviations
- ISO 4: Int. J. Quantum Inf.

Indexing
- ISSN: 0219-7499 (print); 1793-6918 (web)

Links
- Journal homepage

The International Journal of Quantum Information was established in 2003 and is published by World Scientific. It covers the field of quantum information science, with topics on areas such as quantum metrology, quantum cryptography, quantum computation, and quantum mechanics.

== Abstracting and indexing ==
The journal is abstracted and indexed in Zentralblatt MATH, Science Citation Index Expanded, CompuMath Citation Index, Current Contents/Physical, Chemical & Earth Sciences, Inspec, and Scopus.
