= Physics Essays =

Fringe science journal

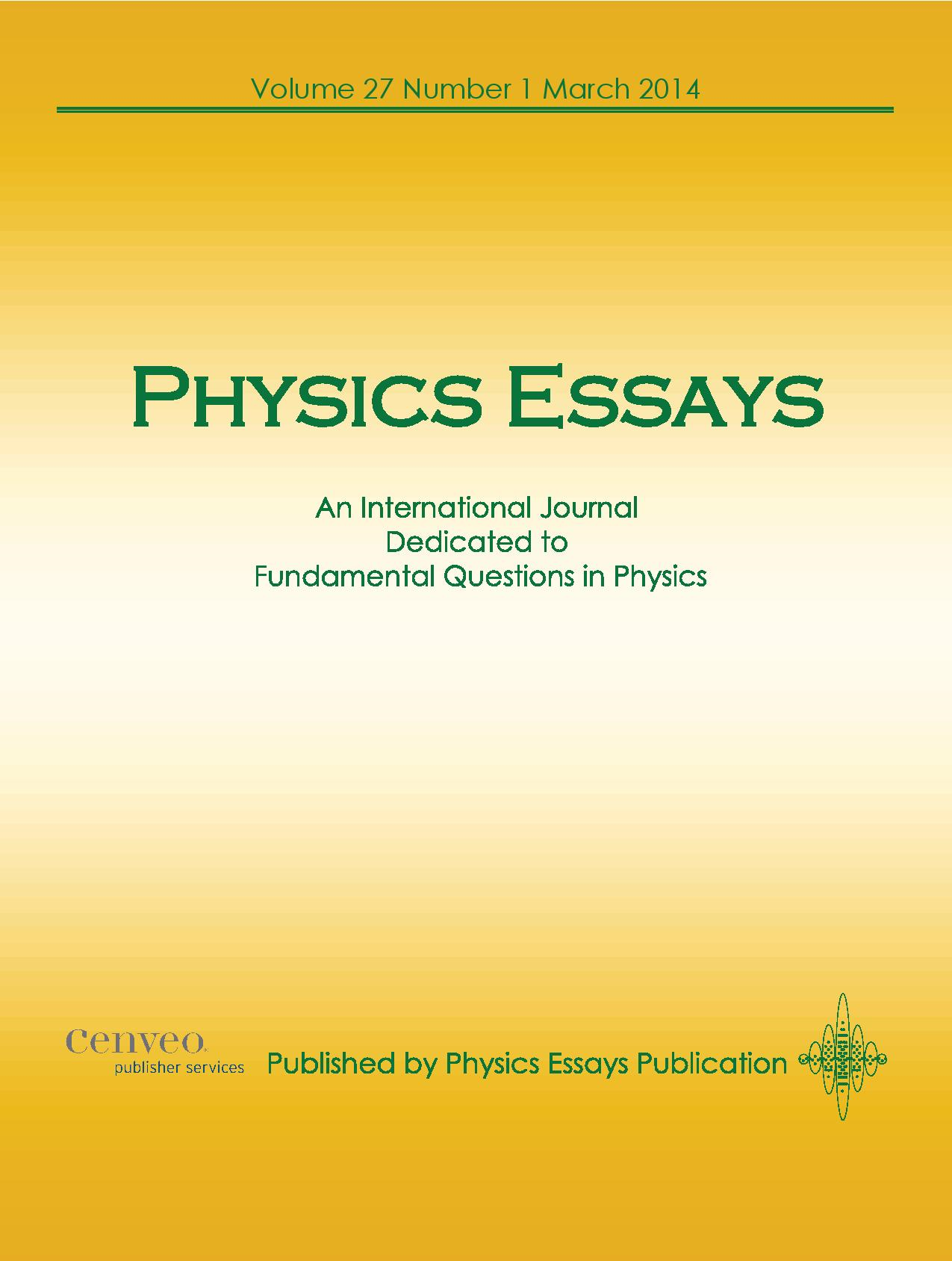
- Discipline: Physics
- Language: English
- Edited by: Emilio Panarella

Publication details
- History: 1988–present
- Publisher: Physics Essays Publication
- Frequency: Quarterly
- Impact factor: 0.6 (2023)

Standard abbreviations
- ISO 4: Phys. Essays

Indexing
- CODEN: PHESEM
- ISSN: 0836-1398 (print); 2371-2236 (web)
- LCCN: cn88039057
- OCLC no.: 643949195

Links
- Journal homepage; Online archive

Physics Essays is a quarterly journal supposedly covering theoretical and experimental physics. It was established in 1988 and the editor-in-chief is Emilio Panarella.

The journal has a reputation for being a "free forum where extravagant views on physics (in particular, those involving parapsychology) are welcome". The journal has been accused of charging authors for publication without disclosing the fees up front.

In the 1990s, the journal was published by University of Toronto Press. Beginning in 2009, and for some period of time, the journal was affiliated with the American Institute of Physics, which managed subscriptions. In 2003, the journal published a paper describing Randell Mills' hydrino theory, which is at odds with quantum mechanics and widely rejected by physicists. In 2004, the journal published a paper claiming proof that the usual mathematical expression of mass-energy equivalence was not valid in general, a claim the author said was being ignored by the wider scientific community. In 2017, the journal published an article from an amateur physicist who claimed to redefine the elementary charge and eliminate the fine structure constant, directly in contradiction to mainstream physics.

== Abstracting and indexing ==
The journal is indexed and abstracted in the following bibliographic databases:

- Chemical Abstracts Service
- EBSCO databases
- Emerging Sources Citation Index

The journal was indexed in Current Contents/Physical, Chemical, and Earth Sciences and the Science Citation Index Expanded until it was dropped in 2015. Its last impact factor, according to the 2014 Journal Citation Reports, was 0.245 for 2013. Scopus similarly dropped its coverage in 2017. As of 2022, it is included in the Emerging Sources Citation Index with a 2023 impact factor of 0.6.

In 2024, the Norwegian Scientific Index downgraded the journal from a level-1 journal to level 0, meaning that publication there no longer counts in the official academic career system or towards public funding of research institutions.
