= Astrophysics and Space Science =

- Discipline: Astronomy, astrophysics, space science
- Language: English
- Edited by: Elias Brinks

Publication details
- History: 1968–present
- Publisher: Springer Science+Business Media
- Frequency: Bimonthly
- Open access: Hybrid
- Impact factor: 2.1 (2025)

Standard abbreviations
- ISO 4: Astrophys. Space Sci.

Indexing
- CODEN: APSSBE
- ISSN: 0004-640X (print); 1572-946X (web)
- LCCN: sn79018902
- OCLC no.: 37915714

Links
- Journal homepage; Online access

Astrophysics and Space Science is a bimonthly peer-reviewed scientific journal covering astronomy, astrophysics, and space science and astrophysical aspects of astrobiology. It was established in 1968 and is published by Springer Science+Business Media. From 2016 to 2020, the editors-in-chief were both Prof. Elias Brinks and Prof. Jeremy Mould. Since 2020 the sole editor-in-chief is Prof. Elias Brinks. Other editors-in-chief in the past have been Zdeněk Kopal (Univ. of Manchester) (1968–1993) and Michael A. Dopita (Australian National University) (1994–2015).

== Abstracting and indexing ==
The journal is abstracted and indexed in the following databases:

- Academic OneFile
- Academic Search
- Astrophysics Data System
- Chemical Abstracts Service
- CSA/ProQuest
- Current Contents/Physical, Chemical and Earth Sciences
- Current Index to Statistics
- EBSCO databases
- EI/Compendex
- GeoRef
- INIS Atomindex
- Inspec
- ISIS Current Bibliography of the History of Science
- Science Citation Index
- Scopus
- SIMBAD
- Zentralblatt Math

According to the Journal Citation Reports, the journal has a 2020 impact factor of 1.830.
