= New Astronomy (journal) =

- Discipline: Astronomy, astrophysics
- Language: English
- Edited by: Jasjeet Bagla

Publication details
- History: 1996-present
- Publisher: Elsevier
- Frequency: 8/year
- Impact factor: 2.1 (2024)

Standard abbreviations
- ISO 4: New Astron.

Indexing
- ISSN: 1384-1076 (print); 1384-1092 (web)
- OCLC no.: 123402017

Links
- Journal homepage; Online access

New Astronomy is a peer-reviewed scientific journal covering topics in astronomy and astrophysics. The journal was established in 1996 and is currently published by Elsevier.

== Abstracting and indexing ==
The journal is abstracted and indexed in the following databases:

- Current Contents/Physics, Chemical, & Earth Sciences
- INSPEC
- SCISEARCH
- Science Citation Index
- Scopus

According to the Journal Citation Reports, the journal has a 2020 impact factor of 1.325.
