= Open Physics =

- Discipline: Physics
- Language: English

Publication details
- Former name: Central European Journal of Physics
- History: 2003-present
- Publisher: Walter de Gruyter
- Frequency: Continuous
- Open access: Yes
- License: Creative Commons-BY-NC-ND
- Impact factor: 1.9 (2022)

Standard abbreviations
- ISO 4: Open Phys.

Indexing
- ISSN: 2391-5471
- Central European Journal of Physics
- ISSN: 1895-1082 (print); 1644-3608 (web)

Links
- Journal homepage; Journal homepage at Springer; Journal fanpage

Open Physics is a peer-reviewed open access scientific journal covering all aspects of physics. It is published by De Gruyter and the editor-in-chief is Sally Seidel (University of New Mexico).

== History ==
The journal was established in 2003 as the Central European Journal of Physics. It was co-published by Versita and Springer Science+Business Media. The founding editor-in-chief was Janos Lendvai (Eötvös Loránd University), who was succeeded in 2004 by Vladimir E. Zakharov (University of Arizona and Lebedev Physical Institute) and in 2011 by Feng.

In 2014 the journal was moved to De Gruyter. It obtained its current name in 2015 and simultaneously became open access.

== Abstracting and indexing ==
The journals is abstracted and indexed in:

- Academic OneFile
- Advanced Polymers Abstracts
- Aluminium Industry Abstracts
- Astrophysics Data System
- Ceramic Abstracts/World Ceramics Abstracts
- Chemical Abstracts Service
- Computer and Information Systems Abstracts
- Current Contents/Physical, Chemical and Earth Sciences,
- Earthquake Engineering Abstracts
- Inspec
- METADEX
- Mechanical & Transportation Engineering Abstracts
- Scopus
- Science Citation Index Expanded
- Solid States and Superconductivity Abstracts
- GeoRef

According to the Journal Citation Reports, the journal has a 2022 impact factor of 1.9.
