= XB-1 (magazine) =

Czech science fiction, fantasy, and horror magazine

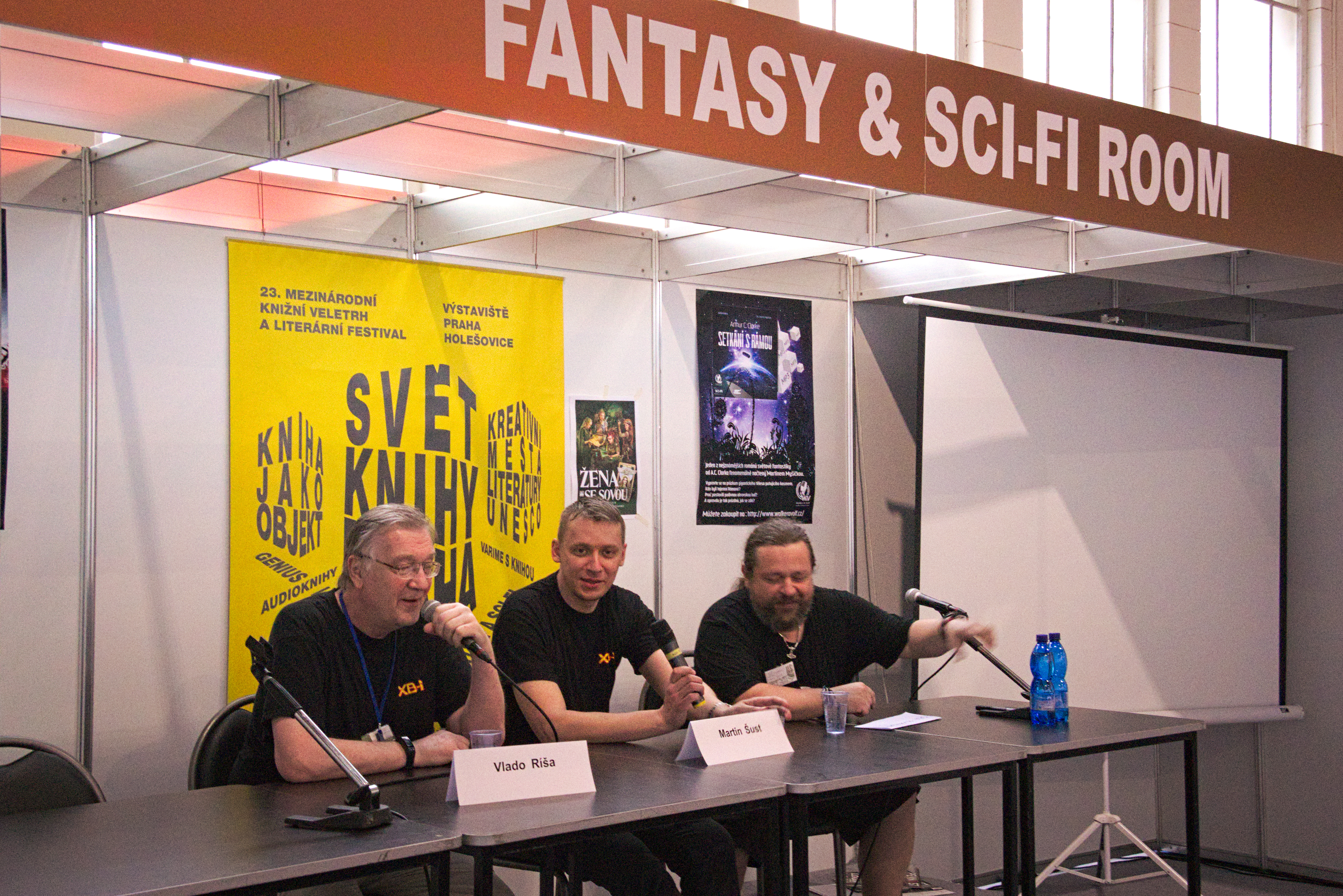
Part of the XB-1 team at the "Svět Knihy" ("Book World") fair, 2017

XB-1 (formerly Ikarie) is a Czech literary monthly magazine dedicated to science fiction, fantasy, and horror.

== History ==
The history of the magazine traces to the second half of 1980s when a samizdat fanzine Ikarie XB was founded. Four ises were published, with different names (Ikarie XB-1, Ikarie XB-2…). The name alludes to the 1963 Czechoslovak science fiction film Ikarie XB-1. After the Velvet Revolution it has become possible to establish an official publication, and in 1990 Mladá fronta started publishing the magazine Ikarie. In 1990 Mladá fronta discontinued the publication, but the team managed to find a new publisher, and continued the magazine under the name XB-1, which is the second part of the name of the starship Ikarie XB-1.

In 1986, the Ikarie fanzine won the Eurocon award.
