= Robert Mann (physicist) =

Canadian physicist and professor

Robert Mann is a physicist and University Professor (adjunct faculty) in the Department of Physics and Astronomy at the University of Waterloo. In April 2022, he was named a University Professor by the University of Waterloo. He served as president of the Canadian Association of Physicists (CAP) in 2009–2010.

== Education ==
According to the University of Waterloo, Mann received a BSc in physics from McMaster University in 1978, and an MSc (1979) and PhD (1982) in physics from the University of Toronto. The Canadian Association of Physicists has described him as having been a postdoctoral fellow at Harvard University.

== Career ==
Mann was chair of the University of Waterloo Department of Physics and Astronomy from 2001 to 2008. He is affiliated with the Perimeter Institute for Theoretical Physics and the Institute for Quantum Computing.

In September 2020, CAP announced Mann's appointment as editor-in-chief of the Canadian Journal of Physics. (CAP later noted that, as of August 2024, he had been appointed Executive Editor-in-Chief of Canadian Science Publishing.)

== Research ==
Mann's research focuses on gravitation and quantum physics, including work related to black holes and quantum information. The University of Waterloo has described his work as including contributions to black hole thermodynamics (including the area sometimes called "black hole chemistry") and to relativistic quantum information.

== Honours and awards ==
On April 4, 2022, the University of Waterloo named Mann a University Professor, a designation given to a maximum of two faculty members each year. Awards listed by the University of Waterloo include a Distinguished Teaching Award (2010) and an Award for Excellence in Graduate Supervision (2014). CAP has also described him as the recipient of the 2019 CAP Medal of Excellence in Undergraduate Teaching. In 2026, Mann was elected a Fellow of the Royal Society of Canada.
