= Universe (journal) =

Scientific journal

- Discipline: Physics
- Language: English
- Edited by: Lorenzo Iorio

Publication details
- History: 2015–present
- Publisher: MDPI (Switzerland)
- Frequency: Monthly
- Open access: Yes
- Impact factor: 2.5 (2025)

Standard abbreviations
- ISO 4: Universe

Indexing
- ISSN: 2218-1997

Links
- Journal homepage

Universe is a monthly peer-reviewed open access scientific journal published by MDPI covering several aspects of physics and astronomy and astrophysics. It was established in 2015. The editor-in-chief is Lorenzo Iorio of the Ministry of Public Education (Italy) since its inception.

== Abstracting and indexing ==
The journal is abstracted and indexed in the Science Citation Index Expanded and Scopus. According to the Journal Citation Reports, the journal has a 2025 impact factor of 2.5.

== Young investigator award ==
Since 2020, the journal confers the Universe Young Investigator Award to a young researcher in recognition of their excellence in fields related to fundamental principles and discovered in the universe. The first awardee (2020) was Lavinia Heisenberg (ETH Zürich, Switzerland).
