= Applied Physics A =

Applied Physics A: Materials Science and Processing
- Discipline: Physics
- Language: English
- Edited by: Thomas Lippert

Publication details
- History: 1973–present
- Publisher: Springer Science+Business Media
- Frequency: 14/year
- Open access: Hybrid
- Impact factor: 3 (2025)

Standard abbreviations
- ISO 4: Appl. Phys. A

Indexing
- CODEN: APAMFC
- ISSN: 0947-8396 (print); 1432-0630 (web)
- LCCN: 98641464
- OCLC no.: 31910913

Links
- Journal homepage

Applied Physics A: Materials Science and Processing is a peer-reviewed scientific journal that is published monthly by Springer Science+Business Media. The editor-in-chief is Thomas Lippert (Paul Scherrer Institute). This publication is complemented by Applied Physics B (Lasers & Optics).

== History ==
The journal Applied Physics was originally conceived and founded in 1972 by Helmut K.V. Lotsch at Springer-Verlag Berlin Heidelberg New York. Lotsch edited the journal up to volume 25 and split it thereafter into the two part A26(Solids and Surfaces) and B26(Photophysics and Laser Chemistry). He continued his editorship up to the volumes A61 and B61. Starting in 1995 the two journals were continued under separate editorships.

== Aims and scope ==
Applied Physics A journal covers theoretical and experimental research in applied physics, including surfaces, thin films, the condensed phase of materials, nanostructured materials, application of nanotechnology, and techniques pertaining to advanced processing and characterization. Coverage also includes characterizing materials, evaluating materials, optical & electronic materials, production engineering, process engineering, interfaces (surfaces & thin films), corrosion, and finally coatings.

Publishing formats include articles pertaining to original research, reviews, and rapid communications. Invited papers are also included on a regular basis and collected in special issues.

== Abstracting and indexing ==
This journal is abstracted and indexed in:

- Academic OneFile
- Academic Search
- Astrophysics Data System
- Chemical Abstracts Service
- Chimica
- Current Abstracts
- Current Contents Collections/Electronics & Telecommunications Collection
- Current Contents/Physical, Chemical and Earth Sciences
- EBSCO databases
- EI-Compendex
- INIS Atomindex
- Inspec
- Mass Spectrometry Bulletin
- Materials Science Citation Index
- PASCAL
- Science Citation Index
- Scopus
- VINITI

According to the Journal Citation Reports, the journal has a 2025 impact factor of 3.
