= Advances in High Energy Physics =

- Discipline: Physics
- Language: English
- Edited by: Sally Seidel

Publication details
- History: 2007-present
- Publisher: Hindawi Publishing
- Open access: Yes
- Impact factor: 1.771 (2021)

Standard abbreviations
- ISO 4: Adv. High Energy Phys.

Indexing
- ISSN: 1687-7357 (print); 1687-7365 (web)

Advances in High Energy Physics is a peer-reviewed open-access scientific journal publishing research on high energy physics. It is published by Hindawi Publishing Corporation.

The journal was established in 2007 and publishes original research articles as well as review articles in all fields of high energy physics. The journal is dedicated to both theoretical and experimental research." It is part of the SCOAP3 initiative.
