= International Journal of Biological Macromolecules =

Scientific journal

- Discipline: Biochemistry
- Language: English
- Edited by: A. Dong, J. F. Kennedy

Publication details
- History: 1979-present
- Publisher: Elsevier
- Frequency: Monthly
- Impact factor: 8.5 (2024)

Standard abbreviations
- ISO 4: Int. J. Biol. Macromol.

Indexing
- CODEN: IJBMDR
- ISSN: 0141-8130 (print); 1879-0003 (web)
- LCCN: 80648380
- OCLC no.: 05059673

Links
- Journal homepage; Online archive

The International Journal of Biological Macromolecules is a peer-reviewed scientific journal covering research into chemical and biological aspects of all natural macromolecules. It publishes articles on the molecular structure of proteins, macromolecular carbohydrates, lignins, biological poly-acids, and nucleic acids. It also includes biological activities and interactions, molecular associations, chemical and biological modifications, and functional properties as well as development of related model systems, structural including conformational studies, new analytical techniques, and relevant theoretical developments.

== Abstracting and indexing ==
The journal is abstracted and indexed in Elsevier BIOBASE, BIOSIS Previews, Current Contents/Life Sciences, EMBASE, EMBiology, Food Science and Technology Abstracts, MEDLINE, Science Citation Index Expanded, and Scopus.
