= Applied Physics Express =

Scientific journal

- Discipline: Applied physics
- Language: English
- Edited by: Masahiro Asada

Publication details
- History: 2008–present
- Publisher: IOP Publishing (UK) on behalf of Japan Society of Applied Physics (Japan)
- Frequency: Monthly
- Open access: For one year
- Impact factor: 2.5 (2025)

Standard abbreviations
- ISO 4: Appl. Phys. Express

Indexing
- ISSN: 1882-0778 (print); 1882-0786 (web)
- OCLC no.: 191921899

Links
- Journal homepage

Applied Physics Express or APEX is a scientific journal publishing letters, with usually no more than three pages per (concise) article. The main purpose is to rapidly publish original, timely, and novel research papers in applied physics. As part of its aim, the journal intends for papers to be novel research that has a strong impact on relevant fields and society. It is notable that the journal considers satisfaction of this criterion as showing the paper merits priority handling in the review and publication processes. In keeping with this aim, its issues are published online on a weekly basis. The print version is published monthly.

The journal is the successor of Japanese Journal of Applied Physics Part 2, i.e., the letter and express letter sections.

== Indexing and abstracting ==
APEX is abstracted and indexed in Journal Citation Reports, SCImago Journal Rank, SCOPUS, Science Citation Index, and Current Contents.

== See also ==
- Optical Review
- Japan Society of Applied Physics
- Physical Society of Japan
- Optical Society of Japan
