= Japan Society of Applied Physics =

Academic society

The Japan Society of Applied Physics
- Founded: October 25, 1949; 77 years ago
- Founder: Hantaro Nagaoka, Kotaro Honda, Masatoshi Okouchi
- Type: public interest incorporated association (公益社団法人)
- Registration no.: A007611
- Location: Tokyo, Japan
- Origins: Forum of Applied Physics (応用物理談話会)
- Region served: Japan
- Members: 23,000
- Key people: President; Makoto Konagai
- Subsidiaries: Optical Society of Japan
- Website: www.jsap.or.jp

The Japan Society of Applied Physics (応用物理学会, ōyō butsuri gakkai) (JSAP) is a Japanese group of researchers in the field of applied physics. JSAP originated in 1932 from a voluntary forum of researchers belonging to the University of Tokyo and the Institute of Physical and Chemical Research. During World War II, most research, even applied, was frozen. In 1946, the society was established as an official academic society.

== Oyo Buturi ==
Oyo Buturi (ISSN 0369-8009) is the membership subscription of the Japan Society of Applied Physics. It is published monthly, in Japanese. Oyo Buturi International (1998) and JSAP International (2000-2008) are related English counterparts to Oyo Buturi.

== Optical Society of Japan ==
The Optical Society of Japan (OSJ) is a division of the Japan Society of Applied Physics. It is a professional organization of physicists conducting research in optics. The organization was founded in 1952. As of 2004, there were approximately 2000 members. It become a general incorporated association in 2014. It is affiliated with other societies in the area of optics such as Optica. and the European Optical Society.

The main journal of the society is Optical Review, and the membership journal is Kogaku.

== Publications of the Japan Society of Applied Physics ==
- Japanese Journal of Applied Physics
- Applied Physics Express
- Optical Review
- Oyo Buturi
- Oyo Buturi International
- JSAP International

== See also ==
- The Physical Society of Japan
- Optical Society of Japan
