= Advances in Space Research =

Scientific journal

- Discipline: Astronomy, astrophysics, space science
- Language: English
- Edited by: Thomas Schildknecht, Peggy Ann Shea

Publication details
- History: 1981–present
- Publisher: Elsevier
- Frequency: 24/year
- Open access: Hybrid
- Impact factor: 2.8 (2024)

Standard abbreviations
- ISO 4: Adv. Space Res.

Indexing
- CODEN: ASRSDW
- ISSN: 0273-1177
- LCCN: 83645550
- OCLC no.: 7004415

Links
- Journal homepage; Online archive

Advances in Space Research is a semi-monthly peer-reviewed scientific journal that is published by Elsevier. It was established in 1981 and is the official journal of the Committee on Space Research. The editors-in-chief are Thomas Schildknecht (University of Bern) and Peggy Ann Shea (Air Force Research Laboratory).

Topics of interest for this journal are all aspects of space research, including space studies of the Earth's surface, meteorology, and climate and astrophysics, materials science, the life sciences, and fundamental physics. Also included in this context is the study of planetary meteorologies, and planetary climates. Other research encompasses Earth-based astronomy observations, the study of space debris, and space weather.

== Abstracting and indexing ==
The journal is abstracted and indexed in the following databases:

- Chemical Abstracts
- Current Contents/Physics
- Current Contents/Chemistry & Earth Science
- Geographical Abstracts
- Geological Abstracts
- Inspec
- Index to Scientific & Technical Proceedings
- Meteorological & Geoastrophysical Abstracts
- Science Citation Index
- Scopus

According to the Journal Citation Reports, Advance in Space Research has a 2024 impact factor of 2.8.
