= Applied Physics B =

- Discipline: Physics
- Language: English
- Edited by: Jacob Mackenzie

Publication details
- History: 1994–present
- Publisher: Springer Science+Business Media
- Frequency: Monthly
- Open access: Hybrid
- Impact factor: 1.8 (2024)

Standard abbreviations
- ISO 4: Appl. Phys. B

Indexing
- CODEN: APBOEM
- ISSN: 0946-2171 (print); 1432-0649 (web)
- LCCN: 98640743
- OCLC no.: 29901949

Links
- Journal homepage

Applied Physics B: Lasers & Optics is a peer-reviewed scientific journal published by Springer Science+Business Media. The editor-in-chief is Jacob Mackenzie (University of Southampton). Topical coverage includes laser physics, optical & laser materials, linear optics, nonlinear optics, quantum optics, and photonic devices. Interest also includes laser spectroscopy pertaining to atoms, molecules, and clusters. The journal publishes original research articles, invited reviews, and rapid communications.

== History ==
The journal Applied Physics was originally conceived and founded in 1972 by Helmut K.V. Lotsch at Springer-Verlag Berlin Heidelberg New York. Lotsch edited the journal up to volume 25 and split it thereafter into the two part A26(Solids and Surfaces) and B26(Photophysics and Laser Chemistry). He continued his editorship up to the volumes A61 and B61. Starting in 1995 the two journal parts were continued under separate editorships: Applied Physics B: Photophysics and Laser Chemistry (ISSN 0721-7269), in existence from September 1981 (volume B: 26 no. 1) to December 1993 (volume B: 57 no. 6) It partly continues Applied Physics (ISSN 0340-3793), in existence from January 1973 (volume 1 no. 1) to August 1981 (volume 25 no. 4).

== Abstracting and indexing ==
The journal is abstracted and indexed in:

- Academic OneFile
- Academic Search
- Astrophysics Data System
- Chemical Abstracts Service
- Chimica
- Current Abstracts
- Current Contents Collections/Electronics & Telecommunications Collection
- Current Contents/Physical, Chemical and Earth Sciences
- EBSCO
- EI-Compendex
- International Nuclear Information System Atomindex
- Inspec
- Mass Spectrometry Bulletin
- Materials Science Citation Index
- PASCAL
- Science Citation Index
- Scopus

According to the Journal Citation Reports, the journal has a 2025 impact factor of 1.8.
