= Planetary and Space Science =

- Discipline: Solar System, planetary science, space science
- Language: English
- Edited by: Maria Cristina De Sanctis

Publication details
- History: 1959–present
- Publisher: Elsevier
- Frequency: 15/year
- Impact factor: 2.03 (2020)

Standard abbreviations
- ISO 4: Planet. Space Sci.

Indexing
- CODEN: PLSSAE
- ISSN: 0032-0633
- LCCN: 60003632
- OCLC no.: 1762457

Links
- Journal homepage; Online archive

Planetary and Space Science (P&SS), published 15 times per year, is a peer-reviewed scientific journal established in 1959. It publishes original research articles along with short communications (letters). The main topic is Solar System processes which encompasses multiple areas of the natural sciences. Numerical simulations of solar system processes are also conducted at ground-based facilities or on-board space platforms. The editor-in-chief is Maria Cristina De Sanctis (National Institute of Astrophysics, Roma, Italy). It is published by Elsevier.

== Scope ==
Research that involves planetary and space sciences involves many disciplines, which is reflected by the scope of the journal.

=== Basic science ===
Celestial mechanics is part of these studies, as this science includes understanding the dynamic evolution of the Solar System, relativistic effects, among other areas of analysis and consideration.

Cosmochemistry is also part of the published research in this journal. Cosmochemistry in this instance, includes all aspects of the initial physical and chemical formation along with the subsequent evolution of the solar system pertaining to these physical and chemical processes.

=== The planets ===
The research expands to include the terrestrial planets, and their satellites. This involves the physics of the interior, the geology of the planet or satellite surface, the surface morphology, and studying their tectonics, mineralogy and dating. Observing the outer planets and their satellites includes studying formation and evolution. This method of observation and study involves remote sensing at all wavelengths and in situ measurements.

Planet formation and planet evolution is of interest when gathering and interpreting data for planetary atmospheres. Atmospheric circulation, meteorology, and boundary layers are also part of the original published research. Understanding is gained through remote sensing and laboratory simulation.

The study of planets also includes magnetospheres and ionospheres. The origin of their respective magnetic fields, magnetospheric plasma and radiation belts is also of interest. Included in this area is the interaction of magnetospheres and ionospheres with the Sun, solar wind, and their natural satellites.

=== Other studies ===
Research that involves the small bodies of the Solar System is also published. Small bodies describes dust, objects of rings, asteroids, comets, zodiacal light. This research also describes their interaction with solar radiation and the solar wind.

Beyond the Solar System, extrasolar system studies are also considered a field of interest for this journal. This includes detection of exoplanets, as well as determining whether or not given exoplanets or exosystems can be detected. Also the formation and evolution of these planets and systems are of interest.

History of planetary and space research is also part of the journal's scope.

== Abstracting and indexing ==
The journal is abstracted and indexed in:

- Applied Mechanics Reviews
- Cambridge Scientific Abstracts
- Chemical Abstracts
- Current Contents/Physics, Chemical, & Earth Sciences
- Environmental Periodicals Bibliography
- Inspec
- Meteorological & Geoastrophysical Abstracts
- PASCAL
- Scopus

According to the Journal Citation Reports, the journal has a 2020 impact factor of 2.03.
