= Chinese Physics =

Chinese Physics may refer to:

- Chinese Physics, a scientific journal published by the American Institute of Physics during 1981–1992, which was composed of articles translated from 12 Chinese domestic physical journals.
- Chinese Physics, a scientific journal published by Chinese Physical Society from 2000 to 2007, a continuation of Acta Physica Sinica (Overseas Edition), now Chinese Physics B.
- Scientific journal series published by Chinese Physical Society, which contains:
  - Communications in Theoretical Physics, with the subtitle Chinese Physics A
  - Chinese Physics B
  - Chinese Physics C
  - Chinese Physics Letters
