= Chinese Journal =

Chinese Journal may refer to these academic journals:

- The China Journal, by the Australian National University
- Chinese Journal of Astronomy and Astrophysics
- Chinese Journal of Atomic and Molecular Physics, by the Chinese Physical Society
- Chinese Journal of Cancer
- Chinese Journal of Chemical Physics
- Chinese Journal of Computers
- Chinese Journal of Electronics, by the Institution of Engineering and Technology
- Chinese Journal of High Pressure Physics, by the Chinese Physical Society
- Chinese Journal of Integrative Medicine
- Chinese Journal of International Law
- Chinese Journal of Luminescence, by the Chinese Physical Society
- Chinese Journal of Magnetic Resonance, by the Chinese Physical Society
- Taiwanese Journal of Mathematics, formerly Chinese Journal of Mathematics, by the Mathematical Society of the Republic of China
- Chinese Journal of Physics
- Acta Physica Sinica, formerly Chinese Journal of Physics, by the Chinese Physical Society
- Chinese Journal of Physiology, published by Medknow Publications
- The Chinese Journal of International Politics
- Chinese Medical Journal

== See also ==
- Chinese Physics (disambiguation)
