= Bilibili =

Chinese video sharing website

- Logo used since 2009

- Main page as of October 2025
- Website type: Video sharing
- Available in: Chinese (simplified); Chinese (traditional); English (global edition only); Indonesian (global edition only); Thai (global edition only); Spanish (global edition only); Portuguese (global edition only); Vietnamese (global edition only); Malay (global edition only); Arabic (global edition only); Bangla (global edition only)
- Traded as: Nasdaq: BILI; SEHK: 9626
- Founded: 26 June 2009; 17 years ago
- Headquarters: Shanghai, China
- Area served: Worldwide; Southeast Asia; North America; Australia; Europe; Africa; South America; Japan; South Korea; India; China; Russia; Bangladesh
- Owners: Bilibili Inc. Shanghai Hode Information Technology Co., Ltd. Sony Group Corporation (5.22%)
- Founder: Xu Yi
- Key people: Xu Yi (founder, president, and director); Chen Rui (chairman and CEO); Xin Fan (CFO)
- Revenue: ▲US$4.34 billion (2025)
- Net income: ▲US$171 million (2025)
- Website: bilibili.com (Chinese edition)
- Commercial: Yes
- Registration: Optional (required for uploading, liking videos, watching videos in full HD, and commenting)
- Users: 500 million (Q1 2026)
- Launched: 26 June 2009; 17 years ago
- Current status: Active

Chinese name
- Simplified Chinese: 哔哩哔哩
- Traditional Chinese: 嗶哩嗶哩
Transcriptions
Standard Mandarin
- Hanyu Pinyin: Bīlībīlī
- Wade–Giles: Pi^{1}-li^{1}-pi^{1}-li^{1}
Wu
- Romanization: Piq7 li1 piq7 li1 (Shanghai dialect)
Yue: Cantonese
- Jyutping: Bat1 li1 bat1 li1

B Site
- Chinese: B站
Transcriptions
Standard Mandarin
- Hanyu Pinyin: B zhàn
- Wade–Giles: B chan^{4}
Wu
- Romanization: B tse6 (Shanghai dialect)
Yue: Cantonese
- Jyutping: B zaam6

Bilibili (stylized in all lowercase), nicknamed BSite (Chinese: B站, romanized: B zhàn), is a Chinese online video sharing platform based in Shanghai. Users can upload, view, and comment on videos, including through danmu (弹幕, "bullet curtain"), a system of overlaid on-screen comments. The platform originally focused on animation, comics, and games, but later expanded into documentaries, variety shows, and original programming.

Bilibili hosts videos with various themes, including anime, music, dance, science and technology, movies, drama, fashion, and video games, but it is also known for its extensive kuso-style parodies by subcultural content creators. Since the mid-2010s, Bilibili began to expand beyond its original audience, a niche market that focused on animation, comics, and games (ACG), and has become a well-known Chinese over-the-top streaming platform serving videos on demand.

Bilibili is known for its scrolling danmu commenting system. Bilibili also provides a live-streaming service where the audience can interact with streamers and games, mostly ACG-themed mobile games, such as Azur Lane and the Chinese version of Fate/Grand Order.

== History ==
=== Founding and early development (2009–2013) ===
During the first half of 2009, due to some internal factional conflict in the similar video sharing website called AcFun, the website had experienced some server downtime that lasted a month and issues with content creators regarding video submission approvals. During this period, Xu Yi (Chinese: 徐逸; pinyin: Xú Yì, known as "⑨bishi"), who was an early AcFun user, had left the platform and took advantage of the downtime to create a fandom community website for Hatsune Miku called "Mikufans.cn" on 26 June 2009, which would eventually be the predecessor of Bilibili. As the website grew in popularity, he modified its focus to specialize on video sharing and launched it on 14 January 2010, with the name Bilibili; a nickname for the protagonist Mikoto Misaka in the anime A Certain Scientific Railgun. Bilibili also names many of its features after the anime and celebrates Mikoto Misaka's birthday on its homepage every year on 2 May. Bilibili switched domains from "bilibili.us" to "bilibili.tv" on 25 June 2011. In late 2011, Xu Yi founded Hangzhou Huandian Technology. (Chinese: 幻电; pinyin: huàndiàn; lit. 'fantastic electricity') based in Hangzhou, Zhejiang to develop and operate Bilibili. In April 2012, Bilibili obtained an agreement with Nico Nico Douga to webcast the latest Chinese-subbed episodes of the newly airing anime Fate/Zero starting from 7 April. However, the program was censored after three episodes for unauthorized operation of Internet audio-video broadcasting services, and Hangzhou Huandian Technology was penalized and fined ¥10,000 by the local government. Bilibili started to display logos on its homepage in August 2012 to indicate its affiliation with the state-owned Shanghai Media Group and make use of Shanghai Media Group's content provider licenses in the hopes of avoiding future legal risks. Meanwhile, anonymous visitors to its website were redirected to a subdomain of Shanghai Media Group Broadband subsidiary (bilibili.smgbb.cn).

=== Leadership change, expansion, and acquisitions (2014–2018) ===
In November 2014, Chen Rui (Chinese: 陈睿) was appointed CEO and chairman of the board of Bilibili. Chen was an early member of Bilibili's community and started watching anime on the platform in 2010. In 2014, he met Xu Yi, who convinced him to become the company's earliest investor. He was the fifth member of the company.

In October 2016, Bilibili announced that it would become the sponsor of the Shanghai Sharks basketball team, whose name was later changed to Shanghai Bilibili. Bilibili chose to sponsor the Shanghai Sharks as both entities originate from Shanghai. In December 2017, Bilibili purchased an e-sports team originally called IM which played League of Legends under the new name: Bilibili Gaming (BLG). In January 2018, Bilibili purchased the broadcasting rights to the spring competition season of LPL, League of Legends World Championship, and League of Legends Rift Rivals. In September of the same year, Bilibili purchased Hangzhou Spark, an Overwatch League team, which took part in the 2019 Overwatch League season. In March of that year Bilibili filed for an initial public offering of up to US$400 million on the New York Stock Exchange (NYSE). The company listed on the NASDAQ on 28 March 2018.

=== Partnership with Sony, original programming, and second stock listing (2019–2021) ===
On 23 March 2019, Bilibili announced at AnimeJapan that they had partnered with Sony-owned American anime distributor Funimation to jointly license anime titles for both the U.S. and Chinese markets. On 9 April 2020, Sony Corporation of America announced it would acquire a 4.98% minority stake in Bilibili for US$400 million, valuing Bilibili at US$8 billion. Upon completion of the deal, Sony and Bilibili signed an agreement for the expansion of anime and mobile games within the Chinese market.

Later that year, Bilibili Gaming, its e-sports arm, signed a partnership deal with Ping An Bank. Bilibili began its foray into original programming by joining the production of a fourth season for Informal Talks. In August 2020, Bilibili produced the show Rap for Youth. In December 2020, it produced a competition program for voice actors called Voice Monster.

In September 2020, the company launched Bilibili Video Satellite. On 3 February 2021, Bilibili announced that it had acquired Shanghai Yarun Culture Communications Co., Ltd, the parent company of animation studio Haoliners Animation League and its subsidiaries. On 23 March 2021, it was reported that Bilibili would raise US$2.6 billion on the Hong Kong stock exchange (HKEX). This would be the company's secondary listing, as it is already public on the NASDAQ in New York City. On 29 March 2021, Bilibili was listed on the Hong Kong Stock Exchange at an opening price of HK$790. In the third quarter of 2022, the number of average monthly active users reached about 332.6 million, including 28.5 million paying users.

=== Discontinuation and Re-launch on International Platforms and Regions (2026–) ===
On August 19, 2026, the official X (formerly Twitter) account for the BiliBili Creator Hub confirmed that they would relaunch to an international audience after the discontinuation of the old app in August 2025. As of October 2026, the app is available for Android and iOS

== Features ==
Along with hosting video content, Bilibili also features a real-time commenting system that displays user feedback as streams of scrolling subtitles overlaid on the screen. Visually resembling a danmaku shooter game, these messages are known as bullet comments, danmu, or danmaku (Chinese: 弹幕; pinyin: dànmù; Japanese: 弾幕; rōmaji: danmaku; lit. 'bullet curtain'). This interface provides users with various controls over subtitle style, format, and movement. Additionally, users can generate translated subtitles, soramimi (phonetic) captions, or specialized virtual effects using formatted text.

=== Technical features and currency ===
Bilibili offers a "high-level danmaku" (高级弹幕) feature, which must be manually enabled by the content creator. Accessing these advanced features typically requires Bilibili coins (硬币), a virtual currency earned through content uploads, daily logins, and platform engagement. These are distinct from B Coin (B币), a premium currency purchased with fiat money.

=== User interaction ===
Danmaku can be posted by any verified user with a linked phone number. The comments generally scroll from right to left, though viewers may disable them. The system supports three primary formats: rolling, top-aligned, and bottom-aligned comments. Non-registered users are limited to 20 characters per comment, while registered users may post up to 120 characters and customize the font size and color. Video creators also retain the authority to save or delete specific comments.

=== Reception ===
Research has suggested that the bullet comment system can satisfy needs for leisure and self-expression for users seeking entertainment. However, the platform has faced external scrutiny, with the Ministry of Culture of China criticizing the system in 2016 for its potential to facilitate the rapid dissemination of hateful or inappropriate content.

== Operations ==
In 2012, Bilibili consisted of nine team members, all versed in Japanese language and culture. Two were web developers, including Xu Yi himself, and the others were website editors and moderators. Bilibili is free to use, with its main revenue coming from webpage advertising and affiliate marketing.

=== Membership ===
Most content on Bilibili is free for anonymous viewing, while some videos require a membership. Select videos are also only available under the Chengbao system, in which case members must pay to access them. Membership is also required to submit videos or comments. Bilibili limits its memberships to balance the quality of its users and moderation capacity. In March 2013, a limited number of invitation codes was shared with existing users. Registrants using the codes needed to complete 100 questions to become a premium member, with questions mostly related to ACG. On 19 May 2015, Bilibili reduced the number of questions to 50, with 20 questions on internet comment etiquette. On 26 February 2017, Bilibili reinstated the 100-question test, with a passing threshold of 60.

=== Subscription ===
On 9 October 2016, Bilibili launched a premium membership subscription service on the site, costing around ¥25 per month, or approximately US$2 per month on a long-term subscription. Premium members get access to videos in high resolution and can receive early access to certain videos, alongside other benefits such as discounts on Bilibili-owned games. From 1 January 2018, Bilibili extended its early access program to premium members, giving them early access to certain episodes of animated series, with regular members needing to wait a week to watch them.

=== Account moderation ===
On 26 February 2017, Bilibili implemented an account-blocking function to regulate site content and user behavior. Under this system, administrators possess the authority to delete offensive comments and penalize users based on the severity of the violation. Sanctions range from temporary suspensions to permanent bans.

To further decentralize moderation, Bilibili established a "Discipline Committee" on 15 June 2017, to allow community members to arbitrate reports of violation. Committee members evaluate whether specific behaviors breach platform policies and vote on the appropriate disciplinary actions.

=== Upload policies and censorship ===
The platform prohibits the upload of identical videos, but does permit the coexistence of the same content in different resolutions (e.g., high-definition and low-resolution versions). In compliance with national regulatory standards, Bilibili enforces rigorous censorship; since 10 February 2017, individual users have been prohibited from uploading videos concerning political subject matter. Such content is restricted exclusively to certified organizations and official bodies.

=== Bilibili Sports ===
Bilibili broadcasts a sports program titled Bilibili Sports. Bilibili officially obtained the rights for the Meiji Yasuda J1 League in its 2024 season in Southeast Asian countries, excluding Thailand. In the same year, Bilibili also gained rights for HIGHSPEED Étoile and F1.

== Community ==
=== Mascots ===
Bilibili's official mascots are elected by its community, Bili-tans, named "22" and "33". 22 and 33 were determined by the final vote tally from the BILI Mascot Girls Election from 7 July 2010, to 16 August 2010. There were 72 mascot artworks received. After the election ended, Bilibili found out that both No.22 and No.33 artworks had the same vote count, with 1,824 each. Bilibili decided to let them both stand as the winner mascots and name them directly from their election serial number, 22 and 33. Artist Hao (Japanese: ハオ) was the winner of the election and the creator of 22 in the election, while artist AUER was the winner of the election and the creator of 33. Hao was officially interviewed in 2018 as a genuine supporter of Bilibili, explaining his inspiration while coming up with the design of 22. 22's distinctive hairstyle stems from Hao's desire to create a "fluttery, electric shock" look, which would be more in line with the theme of Bilibili's name. The community's recognition of his artwork has been cited as his motivation to continue delivering as an artist.

=== Bilibili New Year Festival ===
The Bilibili New Year Festival is a special cultural community program held annually around the Chinese New Year. In 2010, 40 influencers created a special program and related content to celebrate the arrival of the Lunar New Year. As the audience grew, more influencers became involved in the production team. Before 2016, the Bilibili New Year Festival's content primarily focused on Japanese anime. Since 2016, the festival has incorporated content infused with traditional Chinese culture. In 2018, advertisers were included in the Bilibili New Year Festival for the first time.

=== Bilibili Macro Link ===
Bilibili Macro Link (BML) is a brand-representing large-scale offline community gathering event created by Bilibili for enthusiasts. Since 2013, BML has primarily featured a three-day, large-scale offline live event hosted by Bilibili. Today, BML's core activities have evolved into three large-scale performances: BML, BML SP (Star Phase), and BML VR (Virtual Singer). BML primarily features exclusive performances by influencers from Chinese websites, BML SP primarily features exclusive performances by overseas guests, and BML VR features exclusive performances by holographic virtual idols.

=== Bilibili World ===
Bilibili World (BW) is a convention event hosted annually by Bilibili since 2017. With 400,000 attendees in 2025, and featuring appearances by figures such as Hideo Kojima, it is the largest offline digital entertainment event in Asia.

=== Community engagement ===
Bilibili has also established affiliated communities: Corari (Chinese: 协作乡; lit. 'Hometown of Collaboration', currently offline), a collaboration project founding community; DrawYoo, a creative drawing community; and The Ninth Channel, a support forum for Bilibili. In a special interview, Bilibili founder Chen Rui (Chinese: 陈睿) stated that a rich material environment, a comprehensive and high-quality education, and internet services that have accompanied their growth have enabled today's young generation to develop diverse and personalized cultural needs unmatched by their predecessors. He said, "Our users aren't a specific demographic, but rather a diverse group of users, both large and small." "Bilibili's active community feedback loop helps scale content innovation and creator growth", says the editor of MoonFox, a platform that performs financial research on big brands and companies. Bilibili has become increasingly significant in providing companionship and personal growth for Chinese people.

== Games ==
The group's companies have published the following games in the Chinese market:

Bilibili

- BanG Dream! Girls Band Party!
- Guardian Tales
- Escape from Duckov

EPIDGames

- Trickcal: Chibi Go

MICA Team / Sunborn Network Technology

- Girls' Frontline

(Wuhu) Sharejoy Network Technology Co. Ltd

- Fate/Grand Order
- Azur Lane
- Bible Bullet
- I-Chu
- Fantasy Hunter Story

Bilibili HK Limited

- 100 Sleeping Princes and the Kingdom of Dreams
- Jujutsu Kaisen: Phantom Parade
- BanG Dream! Our Notes

Shanghai Hode Information Technology

- Ark Order

== Controversies ==
=== Cai Xukun ===
Cai Xukun, a Chinese artist and singer, was chosen as a spokesperson of the NBA in January 2019. Following his introduction video from Idol Producer showing him playing basketball receiving attention, hundreds of parody videos appeared on Bilibili satirizing the original video. Cai issued a lawsuit notice asking for Bilibili to remove the parody videos. Bilibili responded that they believed the videos were not illegal and refused to penalize the users who uploaded the videos. To prevent potential backlash and spam from users, Bilibili temporarily halted the verification of new accounts.

=== Servers in Taiwan ===
In September 2019, Bilibili was found to be renting servers illegally in Taiwan. The National Communications Commission required provider Chief Telecom to cease the tie-up immediately after the issue was discovered by a Taiwan-based think tank. Video on demand services based in mainland China are forbidden to operate in Taiwan due to national security concerns.

=== Source code leak ===
In April 2019, a repository called "Bilibili website back-end codes", with a large number of usernames and passwords, was published on GitHub. The repository was taken down by GitHub due to "excessive use of resources". The repository amassed more than 6,000 stars in just a few hours. However, copies could still be found on GitHub and other platforms. Bilibili responded that the leaked code was from an older version of their website and that they had taken "defensive steps to ensure the accident won't compromise user data security".

=== Authority misuse ===
On 12 January 2025, a Bilibili user claimed that an employee exploited their position to insert malicious code into the platform's web version, causing the user's account to display blank pages and repeated messages stating, "Your account has been banned." The user also shared chat logs showing the employee threatening to ban their account. The employee, identified by his surname Ni (倪), reportedly engaged in doxxing and personal retaliation after a disagreement with the user.

On 16 January, four days later, Bilibili confirmed the misuse of authority, terminated the employee in question, reported the case to regulators, and issued a public apology. The company has since removed the malicious code, disciplined related supervisors, and offered the affected user a one-year premium membership as compensation.

== Charitable efforts ==
=== Bilibili Video Satellite ===
Bilibili Video Satellite was launched on 15 September 2019. This satellite was developed by CIOMP, becoming the first video remote sensing satellite to be customized by a Chinese internet company. Bilibili uses this satellite to aid uploaders in video production, particularly in the technology and humanities spaces, with the goal of raising scientific awareness among young audiences.

=== Education efforts ===
On 26 June 2019, Bilibili announced that it has achieved cooperation with "Teach for China" to build an elementary school in a village of Dali, Yunnan. Bilibili also announced it would support schools in providing curriculum resources for science, innovation, literacy, and video course art resources.

In 2020, during the COVID-19 pandemic, Bilibili decided to partner with a local educational charity foundation in Shanghai (where its headquarters are located) to build a Bilibili Dream Elementary School in Zunyi City, Guizhou Province. The school is expected to enroll low-income farming and working families in underdeveloped rural areas. Bilibili also asked high-quality content creators on its website to provide tailor-made "Dream Courses" in the form of video lessons.

In 2021, at Bilibili's 12th-anniversary speech, Vice Chairman and COO Li Ni announced the establishment of the Bilibili Happiness Scholarship to support educational development in impoverished rural areas. The initial investment for this scholarship will be 4,194,172 RMB; the number 4,194,172 comes from the total number of "hahaha" and "2333" comments sent on content by community creators who won the annual Community Happiness Award in 2020–2021. The Bilibili scholarship aims to support children in rural towns and to provide them with more extracurricular trips and group activities.

== See also ==
- Online video platform
- Comparison of video hosting services
- List of online video platforms
- Huya Live
- DouYu
