= Institute of Physics, Chinese Academy of Sciences =

Chinese Government Agency

- 中国科学院物理研究所
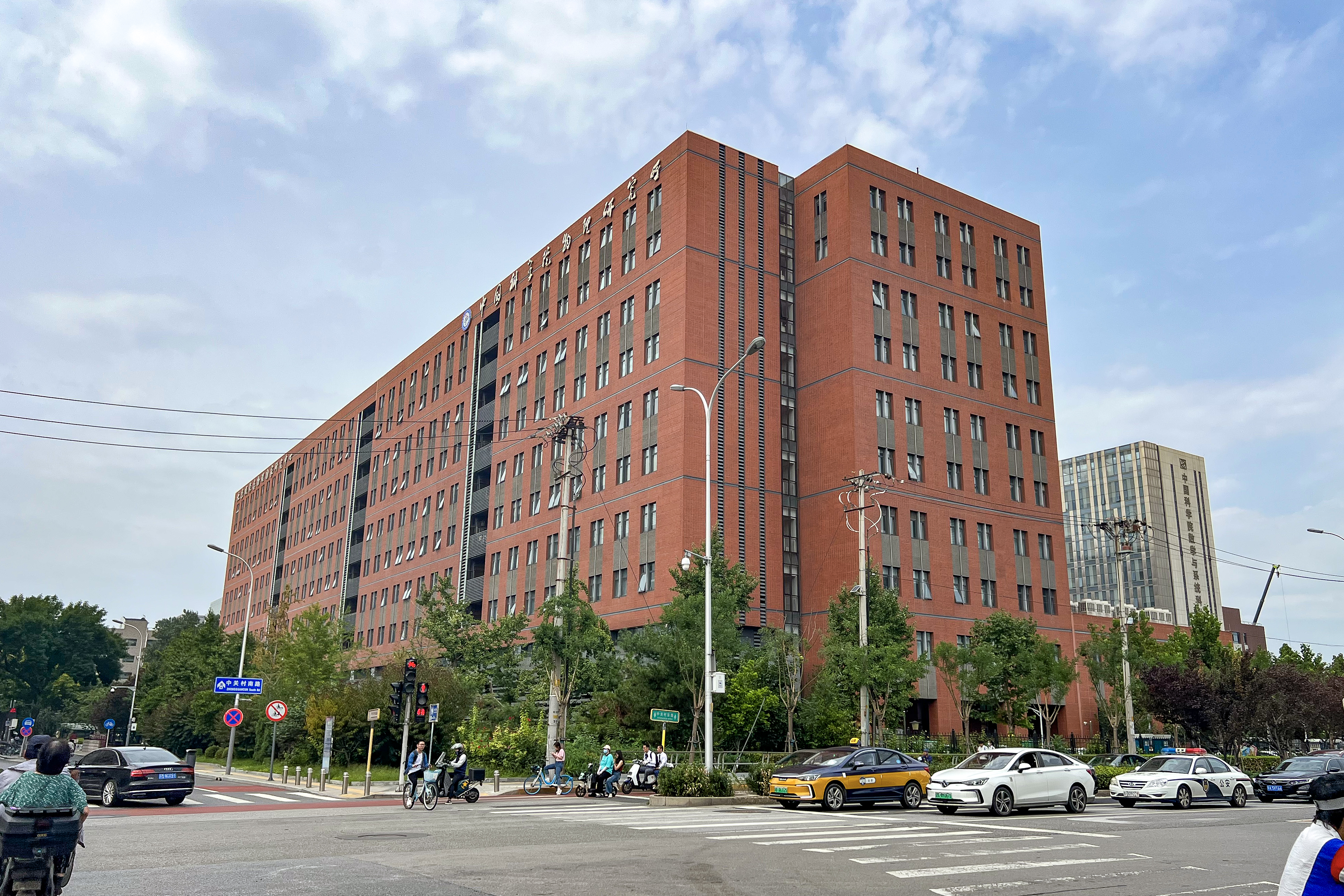
- Abbreviation: IOP, CAS
- Formation: 15 August 1950; 76 years ago
- Purpose: Physics research
- Location: Beijing, China
- Coordinates: 39.98283°N 116.32413°E
- Fields: Solid-state physics Condensed matter physics Nanoscience; Quantum materials Applied physics
- Director: Zhong Fang
- Parent organization: Chinese Academy of Sciences
- Staff: c. 731
- Website: www.iop.cas.cn

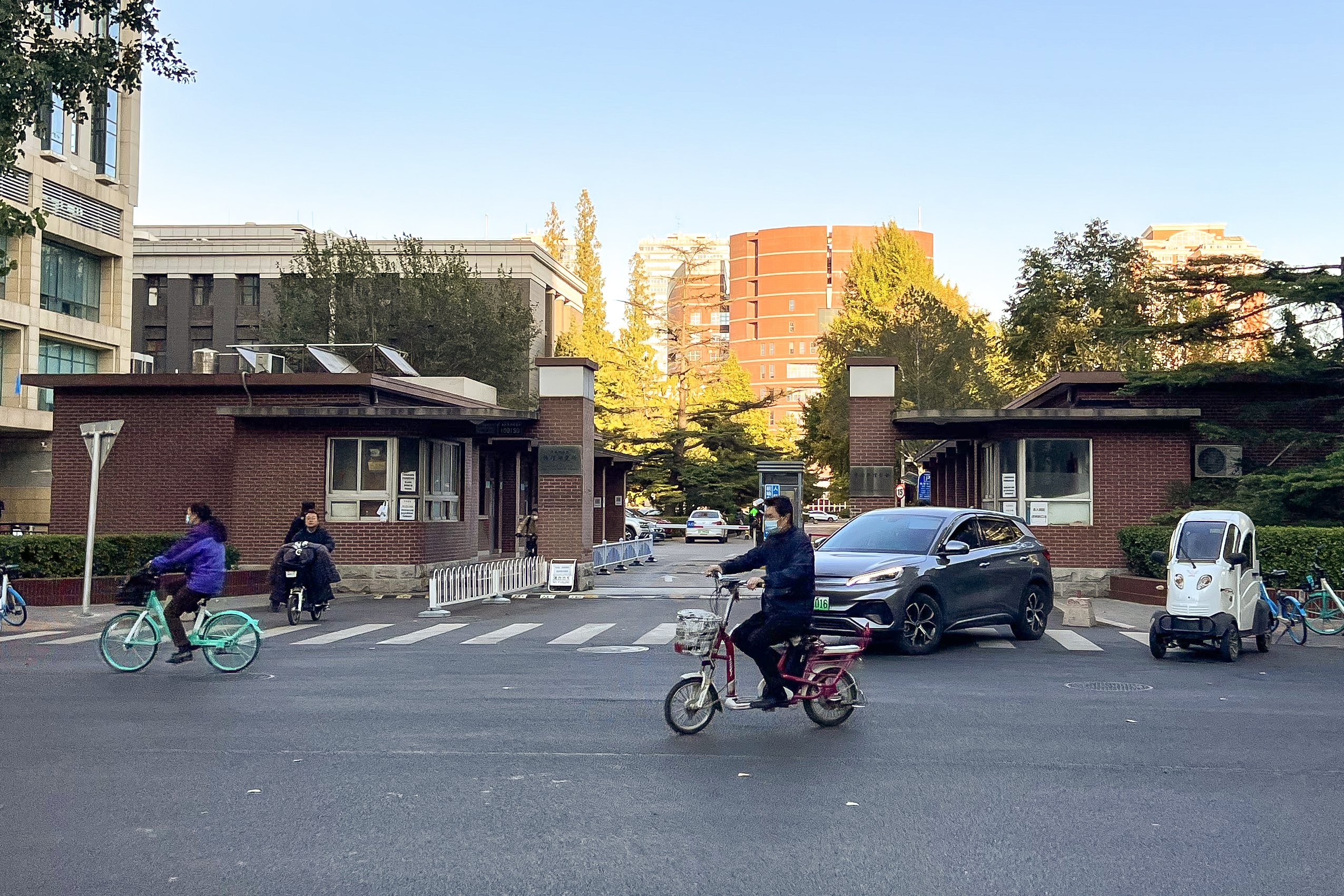
Gate of IOP

The Institute of Physics, Chinese Academy of Sciences (IOP; 中国科学院物理研究所) is the research institute for physics at the Chinese Academy of Sciences, located in Haidian, Beijing.

== History ==
By the end of 2017, the Institute of Physics counted 346 of scientific research, 127 of technical support, with research activities on condensed matter physics, optical physics, atomic and molecular physics, plasma physics, soft matter physics, and condensed matter theory and computation physics. 14 academicians of the Chinese Academy of Sciences and 1 academician of Chinese Academy of Engineering had been elected from the IOP.

Besides Yan Jici and Wu Ta-You, several Chinese prominent scientists have also worked at IOP or one of its predecessors, Wu Youxun, Chung-Yao Chao, Qian Sanqiang, among others.

Three Chinese state key laboratories are now under the Institute of Physics. They are the National Lab for Superconductivity established in 1991, the State Key Laboratory of Magnetism opened in 1990 and the State Key Laboratory of Surface Physics founded in 1987. In addition, a series of Chinese Academy of Sciences key labs in the fields such as Optical Physics, Extreme Conditions Physics, Electron Microscopy, etc. are also built in the Institute of Physics.

The Institute of Physics established partnership with institutions and universities of over 30 countries, such as Stanford University, University of California, Berkeley, the Royal Society of London, Centre National de la Recherche Scientifique, Max Planck Society, Japan Society for the Promotion of Science, among many others. By 2018, the IOP receives in average 500 in-coming visits per year, while the out-going visits are around 700 per year.

The Institute of Physics is the major sponsor of the Chinese Physical Society, a nongovernmental organization which can find its roots in 1932 and nowadays an institutional member at the China Association for Science and Technology.

The Institute of Physics joins force with the Chinese Physical Society publishes four academic journals: Chinese Physics B, Chinese Physics Letter, Acta Physica Sinica and Physics.

== See also ==
- Chen Liquan
