= Zhichuan J. Xu =

Scientist in the field of materials science, electrocatalysis

- 徐梽川
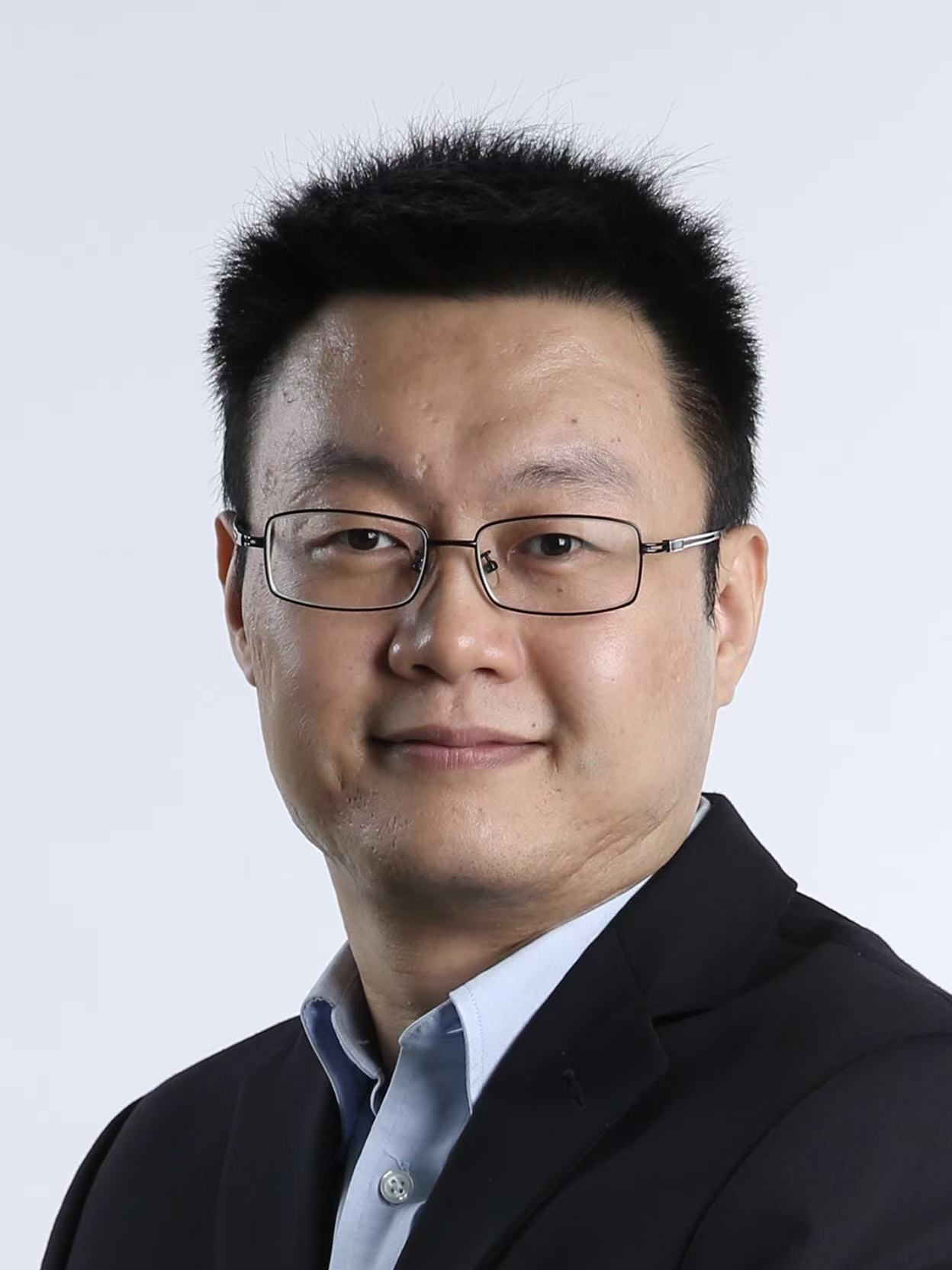
- Known for: Spin electrocatalysis
- Scientific career
- Fields: Materials science; Electrocatalysis
- Institutions: Nanyang Technological University
- Website: https://personal.ntu.edu.sg/xuzc/

Zhichuan (Jason) Xu (Chinese: 徐梽川) is a materials scientist and electrochemist specializing in electrocatalysis and energy conversion. He is a President's Chair Professor in the School of Materials Science and Engineering at Nanyang Technological University (NTU), director of the Maritime Energy & Sustainable Development Centre of Excellence and director of the Centre of Advanced Catalysis Science and Technology. He is a Fellow of the Academy of Engineering, Singapore and the Royal Society of Chemistry.

== Education and career ==
Zhichuan completed his undergraduate studies in Chemistry and his doctoral studies in Electroanalytical Chemistry at Lanzhou University, China. His PhD training was conducted at multiple institutions, including Lanzhou University, the Institute of Physics, Chinese Academy of Sciences (CAS), and Brown University. Following his PhD, he carried out research in the State University of New York at Binghamton as a research associate and later at Massachusetts Institute of Technology as a postdoctoral researcher.

In 2012, he joined the School of Materials Science and Engineering, Nanyang Technological University (NTU) as an Assistant Professor. In 2017, he was promoted to Associate Professor and became a Full Professor in 2021. He is currently a President's Chair Professor at NTU. Xu was one of the founders and the former President of the Electrochemical Society (ECS) Singapore Section.

== Research ==
Zhichuan has worked on the influence of electron spin on electrocatalytic reactions. His work established a mechanistic foundation for spin-aligned intermediates coupling mechanism in electrocatalysis. This effect was identified in different intermediates coupling processes, such as O-O coupling or N-N-coupling. Xu's group analyzed the correlation between magnetic domains and spin-related enhancement of oxygen evolution reaction (OER). The spin-aligned O–O coupling between surface M–O• oxyl radicals on magnetic domains is identified as a key step in triplet oxygen formation. This spin-aligned intermediate coupling was subsequently extended to ammonia oxidation reaction (AOR), where thin-film catalysts with controlled magnetic domains revealed that spin alignment selectively lowers the energy barrier for N–NH dimerization and promotes N_{2} formation.

He has also contributed to the understanding of transition-metal oxide electrocatalysts and standard electrocatalytic measurements. His work on spinel oxides identified the e_{g} occupancy of the octahedral site as a descriptor for governing oxygen electrocatalytic activity and revealed how metal–oxygen covalency and controlled surface reconstruction determine activity and stability. He used of machine-learning methods to accelerate the spinel catalyst screening and design. Besides, related studies on iridium-based perovskite oxides under acidic conditions demonstrated lattice-site-dependent metal leaching processes that generate highly active reconstructed IrO_{x} surface phases. He has also provided guidelines addressing reproducibility and best practices in electrocatalysis measurements, helping to standardize evaluation methods across water-splitting and fuel-cell research.

== Awards and honors ==
- 2024, Turkish Academy of Sciences (TÜBA) Academy Prize in Basic and Engineering Sciences
- 2022, Fellow, Academy of Engineering Singapore
- 2019, Zhaowu Tian Prize for Energy Electrochemistry by International Society of Electrochemistry (ISE)
- 2018, Excellent Scholar, Chun-Tsung Endowment Outstanding Contribution Award
- 2017, Fellow, Royal Society of Chemistry (RSC)

== Selected publications ==
- Ren, X., Wu, T., Gong, Z., Pan, L., Meng, J., Yang, H., Dagbjartsdottir, F. B., Fisher, A., Gao, H. J., Xu, Z. J. The origin of magnetization-caused increment in water oxidation. Nat. Commun. 2023, 14, 2482.
- Wu, T., Ren, X., Sun, Y., Sun, S., Xian, G., Scherer, G. G., Fisher, A. C., Mandler, D., Ager, J. W., Grimaud, A., Wang, J., Shen, C., Yang, H., Gracia, J., Gao, H. J., Xu, Z. J. Spin pinning effect to reconstructed oxyhydroxide layer on ferromagnetic oxides for enhanced water oxidation. Nat. Commun. 2021, 12, 3634.
- Zhu, S., Wu, Q., Dai, C., Yu, A., Wu, T., Ren, X., Li, X., Tadich, A., Deng, D., Liu, T., Wu, Q., Yue, M., Xu, Z. J. Cooperative spin alignment enhances dimerization in the electrochemical ammonia oxidation reaction. Nat. Chem. 2025, Doi: 10.1038/s41557-025-01900-1
- Wu, T., Ge, J., Wu, Q., Ren, X., Meng, F., Wang, J., Xi, S., Wang, X., Elouarzaki, K., Fisher, A., Xu, Z. J. Tailoring atomic chemistry to refine reaction pathway for the most enhancement by magnetization in water oxidation. Proc. Natl. Acad. Sci. U.S.A. 2024, 121, e2318652121.
- Ge, J., Ren, X., Chen, R. R., Sun, Y., Wu, T., Ong, S. J. H., Xu, Z. J. Multi-domain versus single-domain: a magnetic field is not a must for promoting spin-polarized water oxidation. Angew. Chem. Int. Ed. 2023, 62, e202301721.
- Ren, X., Wu, T., Sun, Y., Li, Y., Xian, G., Liu, X., Shen, C., Gracia, J., Gao, H.-J., Yang, H., Xu, Z. J. Spin-polarized oxygen evolution reaction under magnetic field. Nat. Commun. 2021, 12, 2608.
- Ge, J., Chen, R. R., Ren, X., Liu, J., Ong, S. J. H., Xu, Z. J. Ferromagnetic-antiferromagnetic coupling core-shell nanoparticles with spin conservation for water oxidation. Adv. Mater. 2021, 33, e2101091.
- Yu, A., Zhang, Y., Zhu, S., Wu, T., Xu, Z. J. Spin-related and non-spin-related effects of magnetic fields on water oxidation. Nat. Energy 2025, 10, 435-447.
- Wei, C., Rao, R. R., Peng, J., Huang, B., Stephens, I. E. L., Risch, M., Xu, Z. J., Shao-Horn, Y. Recommended practices and benchmark activity for hydrogen and oxygen electrocatalysis in water splitting and fuel cells. Adv. Mater. 2019, 31, 1806296.
