= List of Bilibili original programming =

Bilibili is a Chinese video hosting website. It is known for 2channel culture, Japanese anime, manga, and Chinese animation.

== Chinese animation/donghua ==
Title	Genre	Premiere	Seasons	Length	Status
黑白无双		July 9, 2015	3 seasons	13 min.	Pending
If History is made of Cats		September 2, 2018	7 seasons	4 min.	Ended
The Daily Life of the Immortal King		January 18, 2020	5 seasons	18 - 19 min.	Ongoing
百妖谱		April 25, 2020	2 seasons	30 min.	Season 3 renewed
天宝伏妖录		July 5, 2020	2 seasons	20 min.	Season 3 renewed
元龙		July 11, 2020	2 seasons	19 min.	Season 3 renewed
The Country of Rare Treature		April 16, 2021	10 episodes	15 min.	Ended
两不疑		April 21, 2021	2 seasons	13 min.	Ongoing
Link Click	Fantasy action supernatural	April 30, 2021	1 seasons	23 min.	Season 2 renewed
The Defective		July 30, 2021	16 episodes	20 min.	Ended
烈火浇愁		October 7, 2021	12 episodes	20 min.	Ended
猫之茗		October 26, 2021	Updating	7 min.	Ongoing
The Girl Downstairs	Romance	April 20, 2023	22 episodes	13 min.	Season 2 renewed
Mom, I'm Sorry		May 24, 2024	18 episodes		Ongoing
To Be Hero X	Superhero fiction	April 6, 2025	24 episodes	23-24 min.	Pending

=== Co-production ===
Title	Genre	Co-network	Premiere	Seasons	Length	Status
拾忆长安·明月几时有		Mango TV	October 28, 2020	2 season	17 min.	Ended

== Original variety/reality/talk show/special ==
Title	Genre	Premiere	Seasons	Length	Status
Voice Monster	Voice talent show	December 19, 2020	1 season	1 hour 30 min.	Ended
Waves	Reality	December 11, 2020	1 season	1 hour	Ended
The Next Banger	Music competition	August 28, 2021	1 season	1 hour 30 min.	Ended
Talent or not	Talk show/reaction	August 21, 2020	5 episodes	30 mins	Ended
Rap for Youth	Rap battle	August 22, 2020	1 season	1 hour	Ended
Question mark in Animals	Talk show	June 10, 2020	2 seasons	50 min.	Ended
Bilibili Night (New Year Gala)	Special	December 31, 2019	6 editions	3 hours	Ongoing
Travel in Time	Variety	October 18, 2019	10 episodes	45 min.	Ended
Weekly UP	Talk show	June 30, 2019	1 episode	30min.	Canceled
Informal Talks (Season 5)	Talk show	May 17, 2019	3 seasons	80 min.	Ended
Pets Hospital	Reality	May 7, 2019	3 seasons	30 min.	Ended
Bilibili project	Vlog/short	June 27, 2018	1 season	10 min.	Ended
Cheap Trip	Reality	January 19, 2018	3 seasons	20 min.	Ended
StoryMan	Talk show	August 20, 2016	1 season	1 hour	Ended

=== Co-production (former) ===
Title	Genre	Premiere	Co-network	Seasons	Length	Status
Intern	Reality	July 10, 2020	Dragon TV	1 season	50 min.	Ended

== Original documentary (former) ==
Title	Genre	Premiere	Seasons	Length
Rénshēng yī chuàn (Chinese: 人生一串)	Food	June 20, 2018	3 seasons	30 min.
Unbreakable (Chinese: 不破不立)	Game	November 20, 2021	6 episodes	42 min.
Frontline (Chinese: 火线救援)	Documentary	November 9, 2021	8 episodes	45 min.
Crazy Delicious (Chinese: 奇食记)	Food	January 31, 2021	6 episodes	30 min.
Shǒuhù jiěfàng xī (Chinese: 守护解放西)	Documentary	September 14, 2019	3 seasons	36 min.
First meal (Chinese: 第一餐)	Food	September 19, 2021	8 episodes	30 min.
Rendezvous with the Future (Chinese: 未来漫游指南)	Science	November 16, 2022	3 episodes	50 min.

== Exclusive China distribution (former) ==
=== Japanese anime ===
Title	Genre	Premiere	Original network	Season	Length
The World's Finest Assassin Gets Reincarnated in Another World as an Aristocrat	anime	October 6, 2021	AT-X	12 episodes	23 min.
Re-Main	anime	July 3, 2021	TV Asahi	12 episodes	23 min.
Shaman King	anime	April 1, 2021	TV Tokyo	52 episodes	23 min.
Cardfight!! Vanguard overDress	anime	March 24, 2021	TV Tokyo	25 episodes	24 min.
Takt Op (Note: Also available on iQIYI)	anime	October 6, 2021	TV Tokyo, BS TV Tokyo	8 episodes	24 min.
Kaginado	anime	October 13, 2021	Tokyo MX, KBS Kyoto, Sun TV, ux, HAB, abn, HTB, BS4, AT-X	24 episodes	4 min.
Demon Slayer: Kimetsu no Yaiba	anime	October 10, 2021		37 episodes	26 min.
Tsukipro the Animation 2	anime	July 7, 2021		12 episodes	23 min.
Banished from the Hero's Party	anime	October 6, 2021	AT-X	25 episodes	23 min.
Yo-kai Watch	anime	April 30, 2021		98 episodes	
Boy Meets Girl	anime	October 1, 2021		Updating	2 min.
Dragon Quest: The Adventure of Dai	anime	October 3, 2020	TV Tokyo, TVO, TVA, TSC, TVh, TVQ	100 episodes	
Build Divide	anime	October 9, 2021	Tokyo MX, GTV, GYT, BS11, TeNY, MBS, AT-X, FBS, TV Shizuoka, STV, Chukyo TV, RSK, RCC, Miyatere	24 episodes	24 min.
Lupin the Third Part 6	anime	October 17, 2021		24 episodes	22 min.
Boruto: Naruto Next Generations	anime	April 5, 2017	TXN	293 episodes	

=== Others ===
Title	Genre	Premiere	Original network	Seasons	Length
Animal Farm	Animal documentary	January 1, 2017	SBS	5 seasons	1 hour
Prince of Legend	Teen drama/Japanese comedy	October 3, 2018	Nippon TV	1 season	24 min.
What's so wrong with 'AZATOI'?	Japanese talk show	August 24, 2020	TV Asahi	1 season	50 min.
恋はつづくよどこまでも	Japanese romance drama	January 14, 2020	TBS	10 episodes	1 hour
