= AcFun =

Chinese video sharing website

- Screenshot Screenshot of AcFun's main page, showing thumbnails of popular videos
- Website type: Video hosting service
- Available in: Chinese
- Website: www.acfun.cn
- Commercial: Yes
- Registration: Selective
- Launched: June 6, 2007; 19 years ago
- Current status: Online

AcFun (Chinese: AcFun弹幕视频网), also known as A Site (A站, as opposed to bilibili) for short, is a Chinese video sharing website. The name "AcFun" is an abbreviation of "Anime, Comics and Fun". The website is initially oriented as an ACGN (Animation, Comic, Game and Novel) community and is a video sharing web platform. AC Musume and TD Musume are the representative icons of AcFun.

== History ==
In 2007, AcFun was created on June 6 as an ACG themed video sharing site based on Sina Video.

In 2008, the site launched with a Niconico-style player.

In 2009, the site added drama and movies as new categories. People can create an account and upload videos.

On 13 February 2010, they held their first Spring Festival Gala. On 9 May 2010, the number of articles and videos submitted reached 100,000.

In 2011, AcFun had over 200,000 submitted articles and videos. The website changed its domain from acfun.cn to acfun.tv.It was awarded "Specialty Website of 2010" by Guangzhou-based New Weekly Magazine.

In 2014, the submission of articles and videos reached 1,000,000. On 31 December 2014, AcFun did a live broadcast of Kōhaku Uta Gassen.

In March 2015, they moved their headquarters to Beijing. On 6 June 2015, AcFun did a live broadcast of the show AKB48 anniversary year. On 6 August 2015, AcFun received US$50 million series A funding from Youku Tudou Inc. at a reportedly valuation of US$200 million. On 7 August 2015, AcFun organized an offline event in a cinema. People could send comments while watching the movie Mr. Black: Green Star. The comments would appear on the walls immediately. On 10 October, AcFun registered a second-level domain: acfun.tudou.com.

On 14 January 2016, AcFun has completed a US$60 million funding round led by Softbank China Venture Capital. On 1 July 2016, Liu Yanyan (Chinese: 刘炎焱) became CEO of AcFun.

On February 2, 2018, the website, as well as Android and iOS apps, were offline as the server shut down by its domain registrar Alibaba Cloud due to failure to renew the domain name. Possible financial constraints within AcFun may be related to the shutdown. The official Weibo account of AcFun confirmed the shutdown implicitly but no official statement regarding it had been made. Access for website and apps has been restored as of February 12, ten days after the shutdown.

== Website ==
The website allows users to upload, view and share videos. The users are able to comment in the comment section or directly put an overlaid comment onto the videos, resulting in more interaction and communication while watching videos.

=== Features ===
- Users can comment on the video while watching. The comments will overlay on the video screen, a system known as "danmu".
- Each viewer can create a "blocking list", which allow users to block some unwanted words or comments. There may be some unwanted comments shown on screen while watching videos, viewers can block the unwanted word or comment. The word or sentences would disappear on that viewer's screen. The others viewers can still see the words or comments.
- The website divides videos into different types:
  - Animation (MAD)
  - Music (Eastern, vocaloid themes, and animation songs)
  - Video games (it has many Asian themes but now is mainly MUGEN)
  - Entertainment (TV shows, movies)
  - Articles (politics, military related articles with some OTAKU)
  - Drama

== Controversy ==
AcFun has been criticised for its server instability issues, and the shift on both the official and its user group's political stance while losing the focus on ACGN. During one of the server downtime in the first half of 2009, an early member of AcFun named Xu Yi (Chinese: 徐逸; pinyin: Xú Yì, known as "⑨bishi") had left the platform during this time and had created the website "Mikufans.cn" to deal with the problem of the server instability and other issues creators had with the platform. It was a video sharing fandom website focused on the character Hatsune Miku. It would eventually be the predecessor of the popular Chinese video sharing website Bilibili.
