= Bilibili Video Satellite =

Chinese satellite

- Mission type: Education, Popular science
- Operator: Chang Guang Satellite Technology
- COSPAR ID: 2020-065G (Series of Jilin-1 GF-03C)
- SATCAT no.: 46460

Spacecraft properties
- Manufacturer: Chang Guang Satellite Technology
- Launch mass: 42 kg

Start of mission
- Launch date: 15 September 2020, 01:23 UTC
- Rocket: Long March 11
- Launch site: De Bo 3 barge, Yellow Sea waters
- Contractor: China Academy of Launch Vehicle Technology (CALT)

Bilibili Video Satellite was launched by Long March 11 on Yellow Sea waters on 15 September 2020. It was China's first custom-made satellite by Chinese internet company Bilibili. The satellite was developed by Chang Guang Satellite Technology Corporation.

== Mission ==
Bilibili vice chairman and COO Li Ni (李旎) said in 2020 that the satellite would be able to access remote sensing video and could be used to make popular science videos, which was to include science, technology, humanities and other aspects to encourage the younger generation to remain curious and explore. Farther into the future, the satellite is planned to also customize filming missions for Bilibili users, using the satellite to take orbital photos of the Earth.

== Specifications ==
The satellite was equipped with two high-performance payload cameras, intended to obtain color video images with resolution better than 1.2 m (3.9 ft) covering an area of 14.4 km × 6 km (8.9 mi × 3.7 mi).

== History ==
On 11 May 2020, the initial satellite was transported to Jiuquan Satellite Launch Center. In June 2020, Bilibili announced that the satellite was to have been launched in late June, saying it was "a Children's Day gift". In the event, the launch was delayed.

On 10 July 2020, the initial Bilibili Video Satellite satellite was launched from the Jiuquan Center by the first Kuaizhou 11 rocket. However, the rocket flew abnormally and failed to reach orbit. Bilibili said then that the satellite launch program would continue.

In September 2020, another satellite was launched by a Long March 11 from the Yellow Sea and successfully reached orbit.

== See also ==
- Jilin-1
