= CIOMP stratospheric airship =

Class of high-altitude airship

General information
- Type: Anti-stealth/AEW&C stratospheric airship
- National origin: China
- Manufacturer: CIOMP
- Designer: CIOMP
- Status: Test flight/undergoing testing
- Primary user: People's Liberation Army Air Force
- Number built: 1 prototype

History
- First flight: 2024-2025

The CIOMP stratospheric airship is a yet unknown class of high-altitude airship developed by the Changchun Institute of Optics, Fine Mechanics and Physics, as a means to counter-stealth from stealth fighters of adversarial nations, specifically the F-22 and F-35.

== Design and development ==
The airship is still currently undergoing testing and experimentation and it is unknown if the dirigible would be classified as a blimp or a rigid airship. What is known, is that the airship would be constructed as a drone, which would make it a substantially large UAV, as it would be a 150 meters long.

The main role of the airship, as aforementioned, would be in counter-stealth AEW&C. Reports indicate that the vessel would be equipped with special infrared sensors that can detect stealth aircraft more effectively than radar. Their argument suggest that the infrared sensors should be able to pick-apart the engines of stealth fighters, which would glow at 1,000 Kelvin; emitting a mid-wave infrared radiation three times stronger than that of its airframe. The airship would use a mercury-cadmium-telluride detector along with multiple 300mm aperture telescopes, which would allow it to concentrate on the 2.8-4.3 micrometre wavelength range, where atmospheric interference is minimal. In theory, the researchers believe that the unmanned airship would be able to detect an F-35’s rear and side thermal signature from over 1,800 km away when operating at a atmospheric height of 20km.

Of course, the frontal profile of such stealth aircraft would still be hard to detect due to its much cooler thermal signature of around 281 Kelvin (7.85 degrees Celsius or 46 Fahrenheit) that will reduce viable detection range to just 350km. The researchers suggest that a constellation of these airships would be able to triangulate the target, overcome blind spots and increase their collective detection range.

The main advantage for these airships, is that they are technologically cheap and operate in a "sweet spot"; higher than traditional AEW&C aircraft but closer than satellites. The cheapness to produce means that even a 50% loss would not significantly cripple the early warning and detection capability of China's surveillance grid. Disadvantages are their large size, vulnerability to interceptors and comparatively slow speed of only a 120 km/h (74 mph).

== Specifications ==
General characteristics

- Length: 150 m (492 ft 0 in)

Performance

- Maximum speed: 120 km/h (74 mph, 64 kn)
- Service ceiling: 20,000 m (66,000 ft)

Avionics

- Detection equipment: Mercury-cadmium-telluride detector and multiple 300mm aperture telescopes
- Range against stealth fighter sized targets: 1,800 km (1,100 mi; 970 nmi)
