= Lina Galtieri =

Italian-American particle physicist

Angela (Lina) Barbaro-Galtieri (born 1934) is a retired Italian and American particle physicist. Working at the Lawrence Berkeley National Laboratory, she assisted Luis Walter Alvarez in his Nobel Prize winning research using a bubble chamber to discover new particles, and she later participated in the discovery of the top quark.

== Education and career ==
Galtieri was born on October 23, 1934, in Palmi, Calabria. She studied in the Marconi Institute of Physics at Sapienza University of Rome, completing her doctorate there in 1957.

After working as an assistant at Sapienza University, she moved to the Lawrence Berkeley National Laboratory in 1961. She co-directed the Particle Data Group from 1963 to 1974. In 1994, she became head of the lab's CDF Project, associated with the Collider Detector at Fermilab. She retired in 2005.

== Recognition ==
In 1984, Galtieri was elected as a Fellow of the American Physical Society (APS), after a nomination from the APS Division of Particles and Fields, "for contributions to the discovery and measurements of properties of both light and heavy quark resonances."

== Personal life ==
Galtieri competed in track and field in high school. After retiring, Galtieri became active in mountaineering and long-distance running, including climbs of Mount Kilimanjaro and Toubkal, trips to the base camps of Mount Everest and K2, a hike circling Mont Blanc, and several runs in the Bay to Breakers footrace.
