= Acta Physica Sinica =

- Discipline: Physics
- Language: English
- Edited by: OU-YANG Zhong-Can

Publication details
- History: 1933–present
- Publisher: Chinese Physical Society (China)
- Frequency: 24/year
- Impact factor: 0.813 (2014)

Standard abbreviations
- ISO 4: Acta Phys. Sin.

Indexing
- CODEN: WLHPAR
- ISSN: 1000-3290

Links
- Journal homepage

Acta Physica Sinica (abbreviation: Acta. Phys. Sin., or also APS) is a peer-reviewed scientific journal in the fields of physics published by the Chinese Physical Society. Established in 1933 as Chinese Journal of Physics, the journal was published in English, French and German at first. In 1953, the name of the journal was changed to Acta Physica Sinica and the journal became published in Chinese.

== Translations ==
From 1974 to 1977, articles on Acta Physica Sinica were translated in English and published as a bimonthly Chinese Journal of Physics (Acta Physica Sinica). From 1981 to 1992, American Institute of Physics published a quarterly named Chinese Physics translating selected works selected from 12 physical journals in Chinese including Acta Physica Sinica. From 1987 to 1989, selected works from Acta Physica Sinica were translated and published as a quarterly under the name of Acta Physica Sinica - Journal of Chinese Physics.

== Related publications ==
Acta Physica Sinica is a part of a small group of journals from the Chinese Physical Society, the others including: Communications in Theoretical Physics (Chinese Physics A), Chinese Physics B (established in 1991 as Acta Physica Sinica (Overseas Edition), renamed as Chinese Physics in 2000, renamed again in 2008 as Chinese Physics B. Though once named as the overseas edition of Acta Physica Sinica, it was never an English translation of works on Acta Physica Sinica.), and Chinese Physics C.
