= Particle Data Group =

International collaboration of particle physicists

The Particle Data Group (PDG) is an international collaboration of particle physicists that compiles and reanalyzes published results related to the properties of particles and fundamental interactions. It also publishes reviews of theoretical results that are phenomenologically relevant, including those in related fields such as cosmology. The PDG currently publishes the Review of Particle Physics and its pocket version, the Particle Physics Booklet, which are printed biennially as books, and updated annually via the World Wide Web.

In previous years, the PDG has published the Pocket Diary for Physicists, a calendar with the dates of key international conferences and contact information of major high energy physics institutions, which is now discontinued. PDG also further maintains the standard numbering scheme for particles in event generators, in association with the event generator authors.

== Review of Particle Physics ==
The Review of Particle Physics (formerly Review of Particle Properties, Data on Particles and Resonant States, and Data on Elementary Particles and Resonant States) is a voluminous, 1,200+ page reference work which summarizes particle properties and reviews the current status of elementary particle physics, general relativity and Big Bang cosmology. Usually singled out for citation analysis, it is currently the most cited article in high energy physics, being cited more than 2,000 times annually in the scientific literature (as of 2009).

The Review is currently divided into three sections:

- Particle Physics Summary Tables—Brief tables of particles: gauge and higgs bosons, leptons, quarks, mesons, baryons, constraints for the search for hypothetical particles and violation of physical laws.
- Reviews, Tables and Plots—Review of fundamental concepts from mathematics and statistics, table of Clebsch-Gordan coefficients, periodic table of elements, table of electronic configuration of the elements, brief table of material properties, review of current status in the fields of Standard Model, Cosmology, and experimental method of particle physics, and with tables of fundamental physical and astronomical constants (many from CODATA and the Astronomical Almanac).
- Particle Listings—Comprehensive version of the Particle Physics Summary Tables, with all significant measurements fully referenced.

A condensed version of the Review, with the Summary Tables, a significantly shortened Reviews, Tables and Plots, and without the Particle Listings, is available as a 300-page, pocket-sized Particle Physics Booklet.

The history of the Review of Particle Physics can be traced back to the 1957 article Hyperons and Heavy Mesons (Systematics and Decay) by Murray Gell-Mann and Arthur H. Rosenfeld, and the unpublished update tables for its data with the title Data for Elementary Particle Physics (University of California Radiation Laboratory Technical Report UCRL-8030) that were circulated before the actual publication of the original article. In 1963, Matts Roos independently published a compilation Data on Elementary Particles and Resonant States. On his suggestion, the two publications were merged a year later into the 1964 Data on Elementary Particles and Resonant States.

The publication underwent three renamings thereafter: in 1965 to Data on Particles and Resonant States, in 1970 to Review of Particle Properties, and in 1996 to the present form Review of Particle Physics. Starting in 1972, the Review no longer appeared exclusively in Reviews of Modern Physics, but also in Physics Letters B, European Physical Journal C, Journal of Physics G, Physical Review D, and Chinese Physics C (depending on the year).

=== Past editions of the Review of Particle Physics ===
Year	Title	Reference
1957–1963	Hyperons and Heavy Mesons (Systematics and Decay)	M. Gell-Mann & A. H. Rosenfeld, Annu. Rev. Nucl. Sci. 7, 407 (1957).
	Data for Elementary Particle Physics	University of California Radiation Laboratory Technical Report UCRL-8030 (unpublished).
	Data on Elementary Particles and Resonant States, November 1963; Tables of Elementary Particles and Resonant States	M. Roos, Nucl. Phys. 52, 1 (1964); M. Roos, Rev. Mod. Phys. 35, 314 (1963).
1964	Data on Elementary Particles and Resonant States	A. H. Rosenfeld et al., Rev. Mod. Phys. 36, 977 (1964).
1965	Data on Particles and Resonant States	A. H. Rosenfeld et al., Rev. Mod. Phys. 37, 633 (1965).
1967	Data on Particles and Resonant States	A. H. Rosenfeld et al., Rev. Mod. Phys. 39, 1 (1967).
1968	Data on Particles and Resonant States	A. H. Rosenfeld et al., Rev. Mod. Phys. 40, 77 (1968).
1969	Data on Particles and Resonant States	N. Barash-Schmidt et al., Rev. Mod. Phys. 41, 109 (1969).
1970	Review of Particle Properties	A. Barbaro-Galtieri et al., Rev. Mod. Phys. 42, 87 (1970).
1971	Review of Particle Properties	A. Rittenberg et al., Rev. Mod. Phys. 43, S1 (1970).
1972	Review of Particle Properties	A. Barbaro-Galtieri et al., Phys. Lett. B 39, 1 (1972).
1973	Review of Particle Properties	T. A. Lasinski et al., Rev. Mod. Phys. 45, S1 (1973).
1974	Review of Particle Properties	A. Barbaro-Galtieri et al., Phys. Lett. B 50, 1 (1974).
1975	Review of Particle Properties: Supplement to 1974 edition	A. Barbaro-Galtieri et al., Rev. Mod. Phys. 47, 535 (1975).
1976	Review of Particle Properties	T. G. Trippe et al., Rev. Mod. Phys. 48, S1 (1976).
1977	New Particle Searches and Discoveries: A Supplement to the 1976 Edition of "Review of Particle Properties"	C. Bricman et al. Phys. Lett. B 68, 1 (1978).
1978	Review of Particle Properties	C. Bricman et al. Phys. Lett. B 75, 1 (1978).
1980	Review of Particle Properties	R. L. Kelly et al., Rev. Mod. Phys. 52, S1 (1980).
1982	Review of Particle Properties	M. Roos et al., Phys. Lett. B 111, 1 (1982).
1984	Review of Particle Properties	C. G. Wohl et al., Rev. Mod. Phys. 56, S1 (1986).
1986	Review of Particle Properties	M. Aguilar-Benítez et al., Phys. Lett. B 170, 1 (1986).
1988	Review of Particle Properties	G. P. Yost et al., Phys. Lett. B 204, 1 (1988).
1990	Review of Particle Properties	J. J. Hernández et al., Phys. Lett. B 239, 1 (1990).
1992	Review of Particle Properties	K. Hikasa et al., Phys. Rev. D 45, S1 (1992).
1994	Review of Particle Properties	L. Montanet et al., Phys. Rev. D 50, 1173 (1994).
1996	Review of Particle Physics	R. M. Barnett et al., Phys. Rev. D 54, 1 (1996).
1998	Review of Particle Physics	C. Caso et al., Eur. Phys. J. C 3, 1 (1998).
2000	Review of Particle Physics	D. E. Groom et al., Eur. Phys. J. C 15, 1 (2000).
2002	Review of Particle Physics	K. Hagiwara et al., Phys. Rev. D 66, 010001 (2002).
2004	Review of Particle Physics	S. Eidelman et al., Phys. Lett. B 591, 1 (2004).
2006	Review of Particle Physics	W.-M. Yao et al., J. Phys. G 33, 1 (2006).
2008	Review of Particle Physics	C. Amsler et al., Phys. Lett. B 667, 1 (2008).
2010	Review of Particle Physics	K. Nakamura et al. (Particle Data Group), J. Phys. G 37, 075021 (2010)
2012	Review of Particle Physics	J. Beringer et al. (Particle Data Group), Phys. Rev. D 86, 010001 (2012)
2014	Review of Particle Physics	K.A. Olive et al. (Particle Data Group), Chin. Phys. C 38, 090001 (2014).
2016	Review of Particle Physics	C. Patrignani et al. (Particle Data Group), Chin. Phys. C 40, 100001 (2016).
2018	Review of Particle Physics	M. Tanabashi et al. (Particle Data Group), Phys. Rev. D 98, 030001 (2018).
2020	Review of Particle Physics	P.A. Zyla et al. (Particle Data Group), 083C01 (2020).
2022	Review of Particle Physics	R.L. Workman et al. (Particle Data Group), Prog. Theor. Exp. Phys. 2022, 083C01 (2022).
2024	Review of Particle Physics	Navas, S.; et al. (August 2024). "Review of Particle Physics". Physical Review D. 110 (3). doi:10.1103/PhysRevD.110.030001.

== See also ==
- CODATA
