= Danmaku subtitling =

Subtitle system originating from Japan

Chinese name
- Traditional Chinese: 彈幕
- Simplified Chinese: 弹幕
- Literal meaning: "bullet curtain"
Transcriptions
Standard Mandarin
- Hanyu Pinyin: dàn mù
Hakka
- Romanization: tan5 mug7
Yue: Cantonese
- Jyutping: daan6 mok6
Southern Min
- Hokkien POJ: tuann5 mo6
- Teochew Peng'im: duang5 mag8

Japanese name
- Kanji: 弾幕
- Hiragana: だんまく
Transcriptions
- Revised Hepburn: danmaku

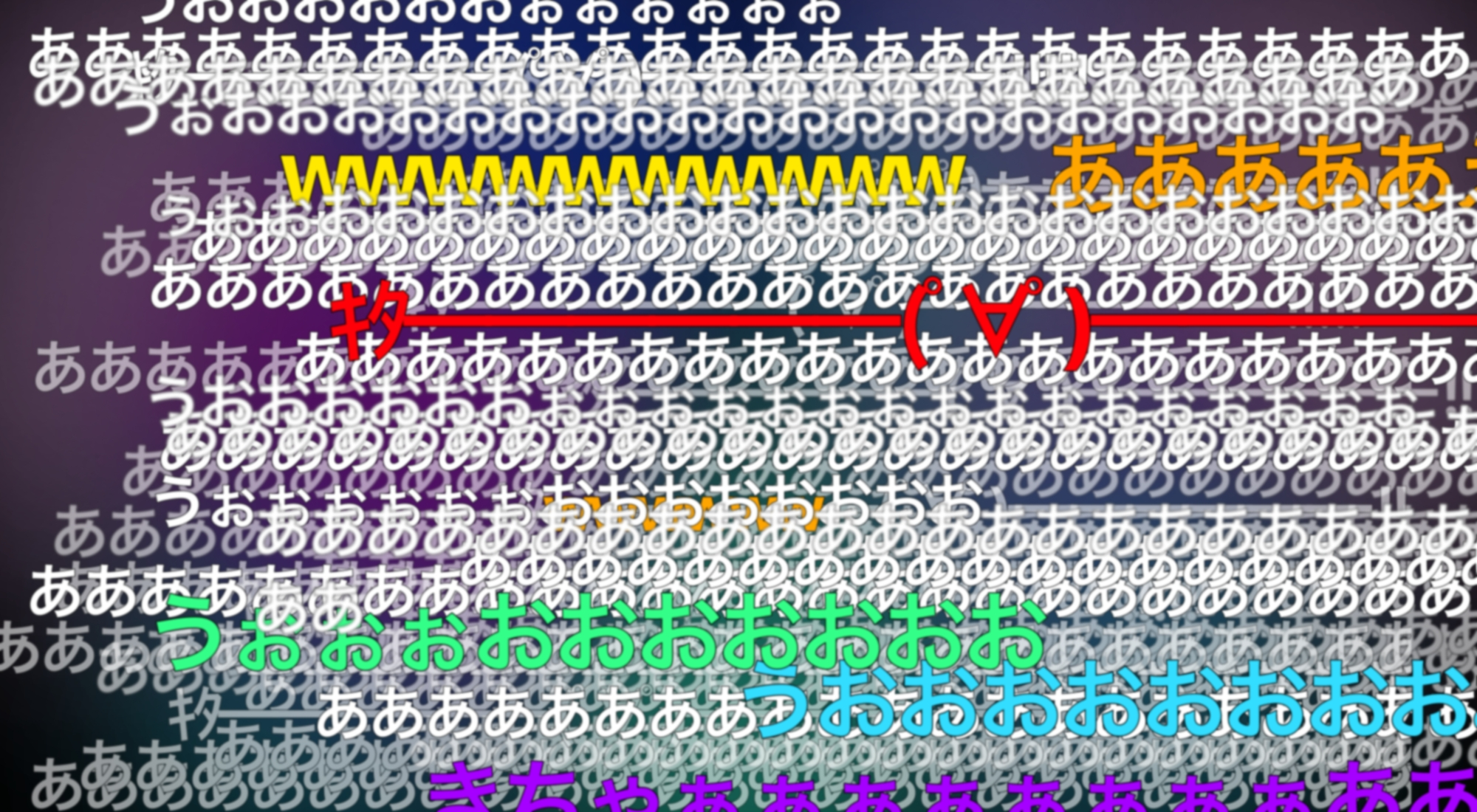
Danmaku on Niconico

Danmaku or danmu (figuratively translated as "barrage") is a subtitle system in online video platforms that originates from Japan and was popularised in mainland China. It allows users to post moving comments onto a playing video that are synchronized to the video timeline. The comments are typically presented as "shooting" across the screen, resembling a barrage.

== History ==
The term danmaku (だんまく) originates from the shoot 'em up arcade game Batsugun. It is a conventional vertically scrolling shooter game; the player's weapons shoot a lot of bullets across the screen, hence the term danmaku. Batsugun is the first recorded example of what would become the genre of bullet hell (danmaku in Japanese) and subgenres stemming from it. While Batsugun is not credited with creating danmaku, it set a lot of the modern templates in place.

=== Japan ===
Danmaku originated in Japan's video-sharing website Niconico in 2006. The videos on the website are mostly generated and uploaded by online users. Niconico provides a comment function which enables viewers to write comments on the screen for the video. The comments will be "shot" onto the screen as in a "bullet curtain", and will be reproduced and displayed in accordance at the time the comment is made. The comments go beyond real-time, with previous and later comments being shown together.

=== China ===
With the rise of Niconico in mainland China, Chinese video-sharing platforms also began to adopt danmaku functions, or danmu in Mandarin. Around 2008–2009, Chinese ACG websites AcFun and Bilibili introduced the danmu system to their video streaming services. Danmu rapidly gained popularity among ACG users in China. Soon, other major Chinese platforms, such as iQiyi, Youku, and Tencent Video, also deployed danmu. Douyin, the Chinese version of TikTok, also began to use danmu on short videos and live streams.

The combination of video and synchronous messaging creates a sense of community for the viewer. The messages take multiple forms including spoiler or jump scare warnings, comments, parody, translations including explanatory notes, expert opinion, and special effects created using text, including visual cues. The format also makes use of memes (233333 means "laughter", 666666 means "awesome"), and its own vernacular. Object recognition technology has been used to prevent the text occluding key parts of a scene, such as actors or singers.

Posting danmu typically requires the user to sign in first.

Due to its popularity and impact, danmu has become a topic of scholarly research, including linguistic, sociological, and cultural study, as well as potential applications in online learning use.

== Characteristics ==
=== Interface ===
==== Video player with superimposed danmaku ====
Danmaku comments left by viewers are overlaid directly on the videos and are scrolled across the screen, synchronized to the playback time when the users input the comments. At certain moments of the videos, user comments fill up the screen giving the appearance of a bullet curtain, or danmaku in Japanese and danmu in Chinese. This movement and synchronization of text creates a co-viewing experience for users who watch the same videos, but at different locations and times. The format also allows more "multi-modal" text than traditional video comment systems - for example, different font colors or screen positions.

==== Editing danmaku ====
The danmaku editor shows the number of connected viewers and danmaku in real time, but there is a limit for the viewable danmaku for each video depending on the duration. The danmaku editor also provides an option that allows the user to deactivate the danmaku function, and also a function to customize the visual effects of danmaku. This includes changing of font, amount, transparency and speed of texts viewable on screen, activating the anti-block function and filtering comments based on specific characteristics like movement, colour and type of danmaku.

==== Others ====
In a danmaku website, users may choose to leave comments in a traditional comment section below the video, but the content of these comments differ greatly from those in danmaku. The former usually involves users commenting after watching the video, writing the comment from an overall perspective; danmaku commenting makes it easy for users to leave comments at multiple timestamps, and include other information related to the content in that specific timestamp.

=== Computer-mediated communication (CMC) in danmaku ===
Danmaku utilises a type of asynchronous text-based computer-mediated communication (CMC) that is experienced synchronously. Comments and annotations appear and disappear from the viewable screen at set times for users unless playback is interrupted. This interactivity differentiates danmaku from traditional comment sections, which are typically located below or beside the video and remain as static posts and replies (resembling the structure of an online forum).

=== Synchronization ===
Communication between users through the danmaku system is not marked by dates of insertion nor any form of authorship, and danmaku does not provide users the option to structure their comments, such as the option to "reply to comment", unlike many other social media platforms. Instead, danmaku messages appear in the order of the moment of insertion in the video's timeline.

This distinctive feature promotes user participation at any moment due to the anonymous, spontaneous and democratic nature of the platform. However, participants will be unaware of possible replies from future viewers as there are no notifications of such responses. Instead, the video would have to be periodically reviewed intentionally after leaving the comments. This lack of knowledge creates responses that are delayed and sometimes redundant, leaving less room for productive conversations between danmaku users.

Some have likened danmaku to the scrolling, real-time comments in livestream videos, although the latter does not feature such a high level of interference of comments on the video. Live-streaming sites that host more concurrent viewers tend to produce massive chats that prioritize crowd-based reactions and interactions over interpersonal conversation.

The temporal incoherence between real time and virtual time is further heightened by the rate of appearance and disappearance of the comment text onscreen. Since there are limits to the number of comments being displayed at one time, older comments are often replaced by new comments. This incites a sense of urgency among the viewers, where the fear of missing a piece of information propels users to search, access and download old danmaku comments that were flushed out due to the limitations of the platform.

=== Knowledge-sharing ===
==== Subtitling ====
As danmaku comments are automatically synced to video, the technology provides opportunity for viewers to spontaneously create translation subtitles for foreign language videos, leading to a sort of "grassroot practice" in which amateur subtitlers are respectfully regarded by others as "caption-kun" (字幕君).

=== Interactivity ===
Danmaku facilitates interaction both between the viewer and the video content, and among viewers themselves. Commenters get to share their opinions and feelings immediately as a video plays. In especially notable parts of a video, a large volume of (often highly repetitive) danmaku comments might occupy the screen, expressing similar emotions. Although the comments are anonymous, they can refer to one another by font colour ("the yellow letters"), location ("the person below") or content ("the one who said"). This makes it possible for users to interact, such as to answer questions or display disagreement.

Some unique slang and conventions have arisen as a result. For example, moments before a shocking, exciting or funny scene happens in a video, many danmaku comments would appear, alerting the viewer, "Attention!!" ("高能预警!") preparing the viewer for an upcoming surprise. Hence, danmaku produces a social experience of co-viewership; the sense of togetherness and belonging is often cited as a major appeal of danmaku videos.

== Criticism ==
=== Distraction ===
Danmaku is capable of creating huge blocks of comments that overlay and even obscure the video completely, and is therefore highly criticised for its visual clutter that can be extremely distracting, obstructing and annoying, especially for viewers outside China and Japan (the only two countries that danmaku had been popularised in) where the danmaku culture is largely absent. Irrelevant, revealing or unpleasant comments can also ruin one's viewing experience.

Most video platforms, like Bilibili, allow users to customise danmaku displays, such as toggling the function off entirely, adjusting the speed of comments, showing selective comments (for example, only showing comments located at the top of the screen), controlling the number of comments displayed, and filtering out comments containing certain keywords. Some videos use artificial intelligence to prevent danmaku from obstructing faces or figures of people. If a video reaches a maximum number of danmaku, some comments will also be deleted.

=== Censorship ===
Since its popularisation by AcFun and Bilibili, danmaku has been adopted by more and more video streaming platforms in China, such as iQiyi, Youku and Tencent Videos. To manage the comments, government regulations and censorship have tightened; in 2019, the Online Short Video Platform Management Regulations were enforced, requiring danmaku comments to be reviewed before being published.
