= Escape from Duckov =

2025 video game

- Developer: Team Soda
- Publisher: Bilibili
- Producer: Jeff Chen
- Engine: Unity
- Platforms: macOS; Windows
- Release: October 16, 2025
- Genre: Extraction shooter
- Mode: Single-player

Escape from Duckov (Note: Simplified Chinese: 逃离鸭科夫; traditional Chinese: 逃離鴨科夫; pinyin: Táolí Yākēfū.) is a 2025 extraction shooter video game developed by Team Soda and published by Bilibili. Set in Duckov, a world on the brink of collapse, the game places the player in the role of a duck who must build a base, undertake quests for other ducks, scavenge resources, and fight hostile forces in a bid to survive the calamity, assemble a spaceship, and ultimately flee the planet.

Escape from Duckov was released for macOS and Windows on October 16, 2025. It sold 3 million units by November 8, 2025.

== Gameplay ==
Escape from Duckov is an extraction shooter video game. It is played in single-player mode from a top-down perspective.

The player controls a duck, whose appearance is customized in a character creator. The duck can equip two firearms, each of which supports various attachments and ammo types, and one melee weapon at a time.

The base is a bunker that requires further construction. It is inhabited by a duck named Jeff, who acts as the initial guide and quest-giver. Additional ducks move in the bunker as the base building progresses and give their own quests. Across multiple locations outside the base, resources must be scavenged and enemies must be fought. Energy and hydration need to be managed through the consumption of foodstuffs throughout the exploration. Status effects may occur over the course of the exploration. For example, bleeding causes health to gradually decrease and can be resolved with bandages.

The game has multiple difficulty options, including a customizable one that enables fine-tuning specific gameplay elements. It also supports Steam Workshop for installing mods.

== Plot ==
Duckov is a world on the brink of collapse. Some ducks evacuate the planet in spaceships, while the ones left behind struggle to survive and compete for scarce resources. The duck protagonist escapes from a guarded facility with the help of a duck named Jeff, relocates to a bunker inhabited by him, and undertakes quests given by him. Other ducks also move in the bunker and give additional quests that the duck protagonist takes on. During the exploration across locations, the duck protagonist scavenges resources and fights many hostile forces. With the duck protagonist's assistance, Xiaoming, one of the newcomers, assembles an improvised spaceship intended for the group's escape from the planet.

At the end, the spaceship launches and leaves the planet. The duck protagonist either departs aboard the ship or is left behind due to its limited capacity. If the air defense system has not been disabled, it will target the escaping vessel.

== Development ==
Escape from Duckov is a game developed by Team Soda and published by Bilibili. Team Soda is an internal studio at Bilibili. It is based in China. The game was built using Unity.

Team Soda set out to design Escape from Duckov as a player versus environment experience that incorporates extraction shooter elements, including the genre's core shooting mechanics and character progression. During deliberations about the game's art style and theme, a duck was drawn by the team's artist, received unanimous approval from the team, and was retained. The game's title was originally an internal project codename, but the team thought it was fun and thus kept it.

Team Soda comprised five members during development. It had three members in the first year and expanded to five members in the second year. Jeff Chen, who formed the team, said that Escape from Duckov is a game that pays homage to Escape from Tarkov. He remarked that he is a hardcore Tarkov player and has logged over 1,400 hours in that game.

== Release ==
Escape from Duckov was released for PC (macOS and Windows) on October 16, 2025.

An Escape from Duckov x Escape from Tarkov crossover was launched on February 10, 2026.

== Reception ==
=== Reviews ===
Reception

Aggregate scores
Aggregator	Score
Metacritic	77/100
OpenCritic	67% recommend

Escape from Duckov received "generally favorable" reviews from critics, according to review aggregator Metacritic.

=== Sales ===
Team Soda announced that Escape from Duckov sold a million units by October 22, 2 million units by October 28, and 3 million units by November 8, 2025. During the second week after release, the game reached a peak of over 300 thousand concurrent players on Steam.

Jeff Chen said that, by his own pre-release estimates, selling 300 thousand units would be good, selling 500 thousand units would be far beyond expectations, and selling anything beyond that would be more than he dared imagine.

=== Accolades ===
Ceremony	Category	Result	Ref.
2025 indiePlay China Indie Game Awards	The indiePlay Award	Won	
2025 indiePlay China Indie Game Awards	Excellence in Game Design	Nominated	
Ultra Game Awards 2025	Independent Game of the Year	Nominated	
Ultra Game Awards 2025	Phenomenon of the Year (Independent Game)	Nominated	
Ultra Game Awards 2025	Surprise of the Year (Independent Game)	Won	
Ultra Game Awards 2025	Independent Game of the Year (Players' Voice)	Nominated	
