= Changchun Institute of Optics, Fine Mechanics and Physics =

Facility in Changchun, China

- 长春光学精密机械与物理研究所
- CIOMP logo
- Established: 1952; 74 years ago
- Location: Changchun, People's Republic of China
- Campus: Urban
- Website: english.ciomp.cas.cn

The Changchun Institute of Optics, Fine Mechanics and Physics (CIOMP; Chinese: 长春光学精密机械与物理研究所), of the Chinese Academy of Sciences (CAS), is a state research institution in Changchun, Jilin, China.

== History ==
It was founded in 1952 as the Institute of Instrumentation of the CAS, by a group of scientists led by Wang Daheng. It was later renamed as the Changchun Institute of Optics and Fine Mechanics. The current name was adopted in 1999 when the institute was merged with the Changchun Institute of Physics, headed by Xu Xurong.

Under the leadership of Wang Daheng, the institute played a crucial role in the development of China's strategic weapons, developing high-precision optics for missile guidance systems. It made major breakthroughs for the submarine-launched ballistic missile program. In December 2025, Reuters reported that the institute had achieved a breakthrough in integrating extreme ultraviolet light into a prototype extreme ultraviolet lithography machine's optical system in early 2025, allowing it to become functional.

== Functions ==
The institute focuses on luminescence, applied optics, optical engineering, and precision mechanics and instruments. It is involved in a number of technology ventures based out of the nearby CAS Changchun Optoelectronics Industrial Park with total assets worth US$403 million.

The institute offers undergraduate, master's and doctoral education programs.

The institute developed the Bilibili Video Satellite, launched in September 2020.

== CGSTL ==
Chang Guang Satellite Technology Corporation
- Native name: 长光卫星技术股份有限公司
- Company type: State-owned enterprise
- Founded: December 1, 2014; 11 years ago
- Headquarters: China
- Revenue: $80 million USD (2023)
- Parent: Chinese Academy of Sciences
- Website: www.jl1global.com

The institute includes the Chang Guang Satellite Technology Corporation (Charming Globe or CGSTL), a commercial offshoot of the institute which manufactures remote sensing satellite buses and unmanned aerial vehicles (drones). Chang Guang Satellite Technology owns Jilin-1 satellite constellation. In September 2024, it launched six Jilin Kuanfu satellites. According to the Norwegian Communications Authority, CGSTL is serviced by Kongsberg Satellite Services.

=== U.S. sanctions ===
In 2023, the United States imposed sanctions on Chang Guang Satellite Technology for providing geospatial intelligence to Wagner Group during the Russian invasion of Ukraine.

According to the United States Department of State, Chang Guang Satellite Technology Corporation provides geospatial intelligence to the Houthis to target U.S. warships in the Red Sea crisis. On 8 May 2026, the U.S. sanctioned the company for allegedly providing geospatial intelligence to Iran during the 2026 Iran war.

== See also ==
- Jilin-1
- CIOMP stratospheric airship
