= Xu Yi =

Xu Yi may refer to:

- Xu Yi (Han dynasty) (died c. 219), Chinese official during the late Eastern Han dynasty
- Xu Yi (Western Jin) (221–298), Chinese nursemaid of Jia Nanfeng, an empress of the Western Jin dynasty
- Xu Yi (composer) (born 1963), Chinese-born French composer and music educator
- Xu Yi (chess player) (born 1998), Chinese chess grandmaster
