= Chinese Journal of Integrative Medicine =

- Discipline: Alternative medicine
- Language: English
- Edited by: Keji Chen

Publication details
- History: 1995-present
- Publisher: Springer Science+Business Media
- Frequency: Quarterly
- Impact factor: 1.978 (2020)

Standard abbreviations
- ISO 4: Chin. J. Integr. Med.

Indexing
- ISSN: 1672-0415 (print); 1993-0402 (web)

Links
- Journal homepage; Online archive

The Chinese Journal of Integrative Medicine is a quarterly peer-reviewed medical journal covering integrative and alternative medicine. It was established in 1995 as the Chinese Journal of Integrated Traditional and Western Medicine, obtaining its current name in 2003. The journal is published by Springer Science+Business Media, and sponsored by both the Chinese Association of Integrative Medicine and China Academy of Chinese Medical Sciences. The editor-in-chief is Keji Chen (China Academy of Chinese Medical Sciences). According to the Journal Citation Reports, the journal has a 2020 impact factor of 1.978.
