= Chinese Journal of Cancer =

- Discipline: Oncology
- Language: English
- Edited by: Rui-Hua Xu

Publication details
- Publisher: BioMed Central
- Open access: Yes

Standard abbreviations
- ISO 4: Chin. J. Cancer

Indexing
- ISSN: 1000-467X (print); 1944-446X (web)

Links
- Journal homepage

The Chinese Journal of Cancer (Chinese: 《癌症》) is a monthly peer-reviewed open access medical journal covering oncology. The editor-in-chief is Rui-Hua Xu of the Sun Yat-sen University Cancer Center. It is published by BioMed Central and sponsored by the Sun Yat-sen University Cancer Center. The journal was established in 1982.

== Abstracting and indexing ==
The journal is abstracted and indexed in:

- Science Citation Index Expanded
- MEDLINE/PubMed
- Scopus

According to the Journal Citation Reports, the journal has a 2017 impact factor of 4.11.
