= Chengbao system =

Chinese system of outsourcing public services

In the People's Republic of China, the Chengbao system (Chinese: 承包; pinyin: Chéngbāo) refers to the private or individual contracted operation of public assets such as bus lines, hospitals, and schools. These operators pay a fee as well as a percentage of profit generated to the state. It is regarded as a form of intrapreneurship.

== History ==
The Chengbao system was first introduced during the land reform in China. In order to get around Maoist-era laws prohibiting land ownership, land was "chéng bāo" or contracted to the public, such as to individual peasants by the state. The system was quickly expanded to include many other assets. Today in China, many public assets and public service companies such as hospitals, schools and even auto companies are contracted out to private operators who operate it with a profit motive in mind but return operating expenses and profit to the government. This has the advantage of creating extra value to the contractor, generates funding for the state and public, and improves services for the consumer.

Recently, "Chengbao" or contracting services has also been expanded to the private sector, where large privately owned enterprises allow individuals who are not employees of the firm operate their assets.

== See also ==
- Reform and opening up
- Socialist market economy
- Public–private partnership
- Independent contractor
- General contractor
- Build-Operate-Transfer
