= Chinese Journal of Chemical Physics =

- Discipline: Physics, Chemistry
- Language: English
- Edited by: Xue-ming Yang (EiC)

Publication details
- History: 1988–present
- Publisher: Chinese Physical Society (China)
- Frequency: Bimonthly
- Impact factor: 1.032 (2020)

Standard abbreviations
- ISO 4: Chin. J. Chem. Phys.

Indexing
- ISSN: 1674-0068 (print); 2327-2244 (web)

Links
- Journal homepage

The Chinese Journal of Chemical Physics (CJCP) is a peer-reviewed journal published by the Chinese Physical Society and hosted by the American Institute of Physics. It publishes experimental, computational and theoretical research on the interdisciplinary fields of physics, chemistry, biology and materials sciences. The journal is currently edited by Xue-ming Yang (杨学明) of the Dalian Institute of Chemical Physics, Chinese Academy of Sciences. CJCP publishes around 120 articles per year via bimonthly issues and has an impact factor of 0.496 (2015).

== History ==
CJCP was established in 1988. From 2006 to 2012 its content was hosted by IOP Publishing, and from 2013 by the American Institute of Physics (AIP). As of 2006, the journal started publishing abstracts in Chinese as well.
