= Chinese Physical Society =

Scientific society

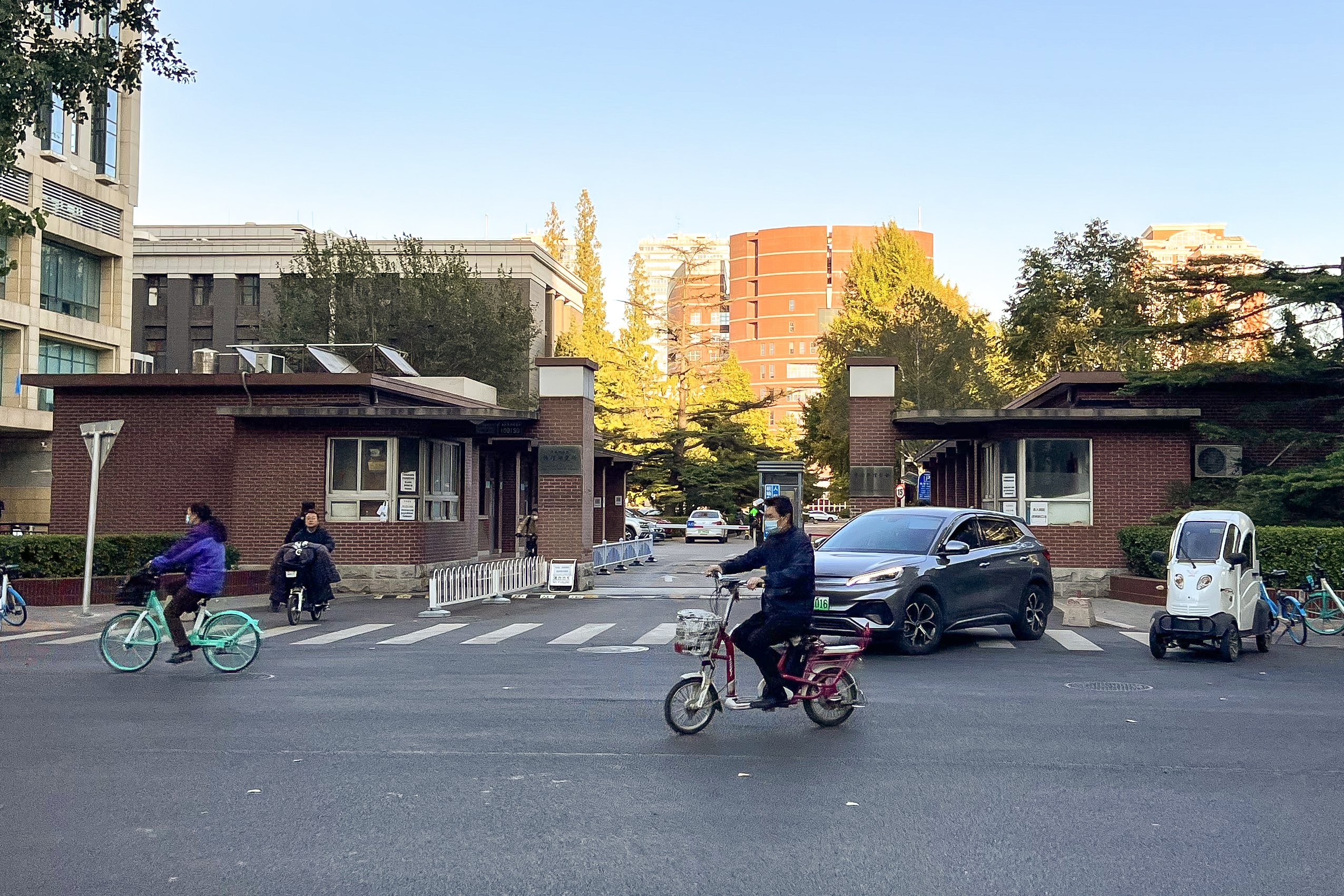
- The office of Chinese Physical Society is located in the Institute of Physics, Chinese Academy of Sciences
- Abbreviation: CPS
- Formation: 1932
- Type: Scientific
- Purpose: To the development and popularization of physics
- Location: P. O. Box 603, Beijing 100190 P. R. China
- Region served: 31 provinces of China
- Members: 40,000
- Official language: Standard Chinese
- Leader: ZHAN Wen-long (president)
- Affiliations: International Union of Pure and Applied Physics (member), Association of Asia Pacific Physical Societies (member)
- Website: http://www.cps-net.org.cn/English.htm

The Chinese Physical Society (CPS) is a professional society of physicists established in 1932. It is part of the China Association for Science and Technology. Current membership is at around 40,000. CPS has been a member of the International Union of Pure and Applied Physics (IUPAP) since 1984 and of the Association of Asia Pacific Physical Societies (AAPPS) since 1990.

== Journals ==
- Acta Physica Sinica (semi-monthly, in Chinese)
- Chinese Journal of Atomic and Molecular Physics (bimonthly, in Chinese and English)
- Chinese Journal of Chemical Physics (bimonthly, in English)
- Chinese Journal of High Pressure Physics (bimonthly, in Chinese)
- Chinese Journal of Light Scattering (quarterly, in Chinese)
- Chinese Journal of Liquid Crystals and Displays (bimonthly, in Chinese)
- Chinese Journal of Luminescence (monthly, in Chinese)
- Chinese Journal of Magnetic Resonance (quarterly, in Chinese and English)
- Chinese Physics B (monthly, in English)
- Chinese Physics C (monthly, in English)
- Chinese Physics Letters (monthly, in English)
- College Physics (monthly, in Chinese)
- Communications in Theoretical Physics (monthly, in English)
- Journal of Chinese Electron Microscopy Society (bimonthly, in Chinese)
- Journal of Chinese Mass Spectrometry Society (bimonthly, in Chinese)
- Journal of Quantum Optics (quarterly, in Chinese)
- Nuclear Physics Review (quarterly, in Chinese)
- Physics Teaching (monthly, in Chinese)
- Progress in Physics (bimonthly, in Chinese)
- Wuli (Physics) (monthly, in Chinese)

== See also ==
- Category:Chinese Physical Society academic journals
