= Communications in Theoretical Physics =

- Discipline: Physics
- Language: English
- Edited by: SUN Chang-Pu (EiC)

Publication details
- History: 1982–present
- Publisher: Chinese Physical Society (China)
- Frequency: Monthly
- Impact factor: 3.5 (2025)

Standard abbreviations
- ISO 4: Commun. Theor. Phys.
- MathSciNet: Commun. Theor. Phys. (Beijing)

Indexing
- ISSN: 0253-6102

Links
- Journal homepage; Institute of Theoretical Physics portal

Communications in Theoretical Physics (CTP) is a peer-reviewed academic journal published by the Chinese Physical Society along with the Institute of Theoretical Physics of the Chinese Academy of Sciences hosted by IOP Publishing. CTP reports on new theoretical developments in physics and its crossover with other interdisciplinary fields. The first volume was published in 1982 and it currently has an impact factor of 3.5 (2025). CTP is published monthly in English.
