= Chinese Physics B =

- Discipline: Physics
- Language: English
- Edited by: Gao Hong-Jun

Publication details
- Former names: Chinese Physics, Acta Physica Sinica (Overseas Edition)
- History: 1992-present
- Publisher: IOP Publishing on behalf of the Chinese Physical Society
- Frequency: Monthly
- Open access: Hybrid
- Impact factor: 1.6 (2025)

Standard abbreviations
- ISO 4: Chin. Phys. B

Indexing
- ISSN: 1674-1056
- LCCN: 2008222300
- OCLC no.: 605190086

Links
- Journal homepage; Journal page at society's website

Chinese Physics B is a monthly peer-reviewed scientific journal published in English by IOP Publishing. It is sponsored by the Chinese Physical Society and the Institute of Physics, Chinese Academy of Sciences.

== Scope ==
Chinese Physics B is devoted to rapid publication of original research papers, rapid communications, and reviews on the latest developments and achievements in all branches of physics worldwide except nuclear physics, as well as the physics of elementary particles and fields. Specific areas of interest include condensed matter physics, quantum information, atomic and molecular physics, optical physics, and plasma physics.

== History ==
The journal was established in 1992 as Acta Physica Sinica (Overseas Edition), publishing papers different from those of "Acta Physica Sinica" (in Chinese) in both language and content. The journal title was changed to Chinese Physics in 2000, and changed to Chinese Physics B in 2008.

== Abstracting and indexing ==
This journal is abstracted and indexed in Science Citation Index, Materials Science Citation Index, Scopus, Inspec, Compendex, NASA Astrophysics Data System Stanford Physics Information Retrieval System, and VINITI Database RAS/Referativny Zhurnal. According to the Journal Citation Reports, the journal has a 2023 impact factor of 1.5.
