= List of fellows of the American Physical Society (1921–1971) =

The American Physical Society honors members with the designation Fellow for having made significant accomplishments to the field of physics.

The following list includes those fellows selected in the first 50 years of the tradition, that is, from 1921 through 1971.

== 1921 ==
- N. C. Krishna Aiyar
- Edward Bennett
- Alfred Heinrich Bucherer
- Keivin Burns
- Arthur Jeffrey Dempster
- Paul S. Epstein
- Griffith Conrad Evans
- Kyotoku Fuji
- Frank W. Ham
- Victor Hess
- Joel Henry Hildebrand
- George Wilber Moffitt
- F. H. Norton
- A. H. Patterson
- John K. Robertson
- Joseph Valasek

== 1922 ==
- William T. Bovie
- Walter F. Colby
- Charles Galton Darwin
- C. J. Davisson
- C. O. Fairchild
- R. L. Hartley
- Thomas C. Hebb
- Raymond Heising
- Mayo Dyer Hersey
- Clarence Wilson Hewlett
- Paul A. Heymans
- G. E. M. Jauncey
- Leonard B. Loeb
- Otto Maass
- G. M. J. Mackey
- F. W. Peek
- Worth Huff Rodebush
- R. B. Sosman
- Leonard Thompson Troland
- Orin F. Tugman

== 1923 ==
- James Percy Ault
- Edgar C. Bain
- Robert H. Baker
- C. C. Bidwell
- G. Breit
- Vannevar Bush
- E. A. Eckhardt
- G. Faccioli
- John S. Foster
- Thornton C. Fry
- I. C. Gardner
- George E. Gibson
- Oliver Holmes Gish
- Franklin L. Hunt
- Loyd A. Jones
- David A Keys
- Stanisław Loria
- John P. Minton
- Francis D. Murnaghan
- Chauncey G. Peters
- Alexander D. Ross
- R. A. Sawyer
- Wilmer Souder
- A. Q. Tool
- Milton S. Van Dusen

== 1924 ==
- Samuel Etienne Bieler
- Albert Bjorkeson
- I. S. Bowen
- Walter L. Cheney
- K. K. Darrow
- L. A. Hazeltine
- William Stubbs James
- J. H. Van Vleck
- Alan Tower Waterman

== 1925 ==
- Ernest F. Barker
- William Bowie
- P. Debye
- J. A. Eldridge
- Kanji Honda
- A. Hund
- C. B. Joliffe
- K. H. Kingdon
- Otto Laporte
- Charles F. Meyer
- Robert S. Mulliken
- H. Nagaoka
- H. H. Plaskett
- Charles Sheard
- H. D. Smyth
- John Q. Stewart

== 1926 ==
- Hugh L. Dryden
- Carl H. Eckhart
- Frederick S. Goucher
- Karl F. Harzfield
- Abraham Joffe
- A. S. McAllister
- Chester Snow
- Frank M. Walters
- Fritz Zwicky
- Nicolas de Kolossowsky

== 1927 ==
- Samuel K. Allison
- W. Bowie
- F. S. Brackett
- Robert B. Brode
- E. Buckingham
- Elmer Dershem
- O. S. Duffendack
- J. B. Green
- J. J. Hopfield
- H. Hotchkiss
- William V. Houston
- Fabian M. Kannenstine
- Frederick G. Keyes
- B. A. Kreider
- Ralph de L. Kronig
- Samuel C. Lind
- R. B. Owens
- J. Satterley
- F. E. Smith
- I. Stone

== 1928 ==
- Henry A. Barton
- Joseph A. Becker
- R. M. Bozorth
- F. S. Brackett
- John A. Carroll
- Harry Clark
- Edward Condon
- James M. Cork
- John A Eldridge
- Alexander Ellett
- Marion Eppley
- H. E. Farnsworth
- Alexander Forbes
- Hugo Fricke
- Lester H. Germer
- Alexander Goetz
- E. L. Harrington
- George Harrison
- T. R. Hogness
- Frank C. Hoyt
- Francis A. Jenkins
- J. C. Jensen
- J. B. Johnson
- Charles F. Kettering
- Arthur L. Kimball
- S. M. Kinter
- Charles A. Kraus
- Charles H. Kunsman
- Robert J. Lang
- Ernest O. Lawrence
- George A. Lindsay
- Adolph Lomb
- Alfred L. Loomis
- F. W. Loomis
- Morton Masius
- J. P. Maxfield
- W. H. McCurdy
- George S. Monk
- Jared K. Morse
- Robert A. Patterson
- W. J. Pietenpol
- David C. Prince
- Chester W. Rice
- Oscar K. Rice
- P. A. Ross
- Arthur E. Ruark
- Erwin Schrödinger
- Charles Sheard
- A. G. Shenstone
- John C. Slater
- Joseph Slepian
- Keith K. Smith
- W. W. Stifler
- Louis A. Turner
- Harold C. Urey
- M. S. Vallarta
- Hugo B. Wahlin
- Alan T. Waterman
- E. C. Watson
- William W. Watson
- R. L. Wegel
- Edward C. Wente
- Hermann Weyl
- Charles T. Zahn

== 1929 ==
- Robert d'Escourt Atkinson
- James A. Beattie
- Arthur Bramley
- L. F. Curtiss
- Joseph W. Ellis
- Gaylord P. Harnwell
- William V. Houston
- Joseph Kaplan
- C. C. Kiess
- Vern O. Knudsen
- Robert B. Lindsay
- Edward Mack, Jr
- Harry B. Maris
- Addams S. McAllister
- Carleton C. Murdock
- Jonas B. Nathanson
- J. R. Oppenheimer
- Thomas H. Osgood
- Hugh S. Taylor
- E. P. T. Tyndall
- John B. Whitehead
- J. W. Williams

== 1930 ==
- J. Frenkel
- Thomas H. Johnson
- Julian E. Mack
- George F. McEwen
- William Albert Noyes
- Otto Oldenberg
- Chester Snow
- Thomas Spooner
- J. J. Weigle
- Harvey E. White
- John G. Winans
- W. H. Zachariasen

== 1931 ==
- Fred Allison
- Donald H. Andrews
- Alice H. Armstrong
- Edward J. Baldes
- James H. Bartlett
- Russell S. Bartlett
- J. W. Beams
- J. A. Bearden
- Ralph D. Bennett
- F. Russell Bichowsky
- Francis Bitter
- Oswald Blackwood
- Walker Bleakney
- C. Boeckner
- David G. Bourgin
- Joseph C. Boyce
- Charles J. Brasefield
- A. Keith Brewer
- Ferdinand Brickwedde
- James B. Brinsmade
- W. G. Brombacher
- Detlev W. Bronk
- S. Leroy Brown
- Andrew B. Bryan
- Perry Byerly
- Theodore W. Case
- V. L. Chrisler
- Andrew Christy
- George L. Clark
- Kenneth S. Cole
- J. R. Collins
- Donald Cooksey
- Richard T. Cox
- William H. Crew
- Leo H. Dawson
- David M. Dennison
- Elmer Dershem
- Jane M. Dewey
- G. H. Dieke
- Lee A. DuBridge
- Jesse W. M. DuMond
- Theodore Dunham Jr.
- James M. Eglin
- Frederick E. Fowle
- John G. Frayne
- James Friauf
- Nadiashda Galli-Shohat
- William F. Giaque
- George Glockler
- Samuel Goudsmit
- Frank Gray
- Grover R. Greenslade
- Ross Gunn
- Otto Halpern
- William R. Ham
- Arthur C. Hardy
- Robert J. Havighurst
- L. Grant Hector
- Edward L. Hill
- Maurice L. Huggins
- Elmer Hutchinson
- Sydney B. Ingram
- Lewis V. Judson
- J. C. Karcher
- Sebastian Karrer
- E. Lee Kinsey
- Paul Kirkpatrick
- Dewey D. Knowles
- Lewis R. Koller
- Frank C. Kracek
- Victor K. LaMer
- Rudolf Ladenburg
- R. M. Langer
- Karl Lark-Horovitz
- Charles C. Lauritsen
- Victor F. Lenzen
- H. H. Lester
- Noel C. Little
- Walter A. MacNair
- Louis R. Maxwell
- Philip M. Morse
- L. L. Nettleton
- W. W. Nicholas
- J. Rud Nielsen
- Wayne B. Nottingham
- Christian Nusbaum
- Paul S. Olmstead
- A. R. Olpin
- Dimitry H. Olshevsky
- Lars Onsager
- John M. Ort
- Frederic Palmer
- Linus Pauling
- Leo J. Peters
- Shirley L. Quimby
- I. I. Rabi
- Hubert H. Race
- N. Rashevsky
- Edward P. Robertson
- Vladimir Rojansky
- Duane Roller
- Richard Ruedy
- Edward O. Salant
- William Schriever
- A. G. Shenstone
- Francis G. Slack
- William W. Sleator
- Sinclair Smith
- Ambrose H. Stang
- F. W. Stevens
- Ernest C. G. Stuckelberg
- John B. Taylor
- James D. Tear
- Lewi Tonks
- Alva Turner
- M. A. Tuve
- J. T. Tykociner
- George E. Uhlenbeck
- D. S. Villars
- G. R. Wait
- Warren Weaver
- Lars A. Welo
- T. Russell Wilkins
- N. H. Williams
- Robert C. Williamson
- Thomas A. Wilson
- Enos E. Witmer
- Jay W. Woodrow
- Winthrop R. Wright
- Oliver R. Wulf
- Ralph W. G. Wyckoff
- Mark Zemansky
- Otto J. Zobel
- R. V. Zumstein
- Vladimir Zworykin
- Max von Laue

== 1932 ==
- S. Herbert Anderson
- Richard M. Badger
- Kenneth T. Bainbridge
- Weldon G. Brown
- G. B. Kistiakowsky
- Cornelius Lanczos
- J. E. Lennard-Jones
- Gordon L. Locher
- Harold Pender
- Eugen P. Wigner
- John von Neumann

== 1933 ==
- Gerald M. Almy
- James H. Bartlett
- Joseph G. Brown
- W. Edwards Deming
- R. T. Dufford
- P. Gerald Kruger
- Harold M. Mott-Smith

== 1934 ==
- Carl D. Anderson
- R. M. Badger
- Willard H. Bennett
- Paul P. Cioffi
- Halsey A. Frederick
- Louis P. Granath
- Charles D. Hodman
- Reginald L. Jones
- Alfred Lande
- M. Stanley Livingston
- Walter C. Michels
- L. M. Mott-Smith
- Harald H. Nielsen
- M. L. Pool
- R. R. Riesz
- J. E. Shrader
- Shirleigh Silverman
- K. J. Sixtus
- Lloyd P. Smith
- H. F. Stimson
- John Strong
- Lauriston S. Taylor
- Llewellyn H. Thomas
- Robert J. Van de Graaff
- Ernst Wilhelmy

== 1935 ==
- Arthur J. Aheard
- Robert F. Bacher
- Robert Bowling Barnes
- Hans Bethe
- F. H. Crawford
- John R. Dunning
- Gerald W. Fox
- Enrique Gaviola
- Otto Glasser
- Lawrence R. Hafstad
- J. D. Hanawalt
- James D. Hardy
- Francis E. Haworth
- Malcolm C. Henderson
- John J. Hopfield
- Walter S. Huxford
- M. J. Kelly
- Roy J. Kennedy
- Franz N. D. Kurie
- Edward S. Lamar
- W. Wallace Lozier
- Edwin M. McMillan
- Carl W. Miller
- Harry R. Mimno
- Robert F. Paton
- Gerald L. Pearson
- Earle K. Plyler
- Ernest C. Pollard
- Raymond J. Seeger
- Lewis K. Silicox
- Clinton L. Utterback
- Arthur P. R. Wadlund
- Bertram E. Warren
- Hugh C. Wolfe
- Clarence Zener

== 1936 ==
- Norman I. Adams
- Mildred Allen
- William P. Allis
- Gladys A. Anslow
- H. Beutler
- N. Henry Black
- Norris E. Bradbury
- Eli Franklin Burton
- Alvin B. Cardwell
- M. F. Crawford
- Paul H. Dike
- C. Drummond Ellis
- Robley D. Evans
- Floyd A. Firestone
- Alfred B. Focke
- Donald D. Foster
- R. H. Fowler
- Nathaniel H. Frank
- Wendell H. Furry
- Lachlan Gilchrist
- H. Grayson-Smith
- Erich Hausmann
- Sterling B. Hendricks
- Frederick V. Hunt
- Dunham Jackson
- Hubert M. James
- Ernest J. Jones
- Hans Mueller
- George M. Murphy
- Henry Victor Neher
- Lothar Nordheim
- John L. Rose
- Jenny E. Rosenthal
- George H. Shortley
- L. B. Slichter
- Leland B. Snoddy
- E. C. Stevenson
- Donald C. Stockbarger
- James D. Stranathan
- Julius A. Stratton
- J. C. Street
- Edward Teller
- Robert N. Varney
- John P. Vinti
- John A. Wheeler
- Ernest O. Wollan
- E. J. Workman
- John C. G. Wulff

== 1937 ==
- Sidney Walter Barnes
- Preston R. Bassett
- Richard A. Beth
- Felix Bloch
- Emma P. Carr
- Carl T. Chase
- F. Woodbridge Constant
- H. Richard Crane
- Charles S. Fazel
- J. Stuart Foster
- George Gamow
- Arthur Haas
- R. G. Herb
- Gerhard Herzberg
- Herrick L. Johnston
- Edward B. Jordan
- P. Kapitza
- Harold P. Knauss
- Hilario Magliano
- R. C. Mason
- J. C. Mouzon
- Walter M. Nielsen
- Lyman G. Parratt
- Milton S. Plesset
- G. W. Potapenko
- Richard D. Present
- Frederick Seitz
- F. Simon
- Charles P. Smyth
- Harry J. White
- Dudley Williams
- Alfred Wolf

== 1938 ==
- W. E. Albertson
- J. G. Albright
- Alexander Allen
- Luis Alvarez
- John Bardeen
- E. L. Bowles
- William F. Brown
- J. Franklin Carlson
- R. C. Colwell
- Albert S. Coolidge
- Palmer H. Craig
- Daniel S. Elliott
- Walter B. Ellwood
- Maurice Ewing
- W. A. Fowler
- Walter Gordy
- Eugene Guth
- G. G. Harvey
- Leland J. Haworth
- Joseph E. Henderson
- Clarence N. Hickman
- J. Barton Hong
- Victor E. Lagg
- Willis E. Lamb
- John J. Linvingood
- Frederick B. Llewellyn
- John H. Manley
- Carol G. Montgomery
- D. D. Montgomery
- Rose C. L. Mooney
- A. H. Nielson
- A. O. C. Nier
- Foster C. Nix
- A. Nordsiek
- Melba Phillips
- J. R. Richardson
- Rogers D. Rusk
- John C. Schelleng
- Robert Serber
- Robert S. Shankland
- William Shockley
- William R. Smythe
- John C. Steinberg
- A. F. C. Stevenson
- R. L. Thorton
- J. G. Trump
- L. C. Van Atta
- Karl S. Van Dyke
- Ralph D. Wyckoff
- Jerrold Zacharias

== 1939 ==
- Allen V. Astin
- Paul L. Bayley
- Katharine Burr Blodgett
- C. Hawley Cartwright
- Ernest E. Charlton
- Jacob Clay
- Gioacchino Failla
- Franco Rasetti
- Enrico Fermi
- James B. Fisk
- Gorton R. Fonda
- Moritz Goldhaber
- Paul M. Gross
- William W. Hansen
- Caryl P. Haskins
- William P. Jesse
- Gleason W. Kenrich
- Emil J. Konopinski
- Sorgo A. Korff
- Donald H. Loughridge
- Millard F. Manning
- Karl W. Moissner
- Henry M. O'Bryan
- Arthur L. Patterson
- Lynn H. Rumbaugh
- Leonard I. Schiff
- Gordon Shrum
- Theodore E. Sterno
- Chauncey G. Suits
- Viktor F Weisskopf
- Milton G. White
- Howell J. Williams
- John H. Williams
- E. Bright Wilson
- Rolland M. Zabel
- Walter H. Zinn
- Stanley N. van Voorhis
- Arthur von Hippel

== 1940 ==
- Otto Beeck
- J. W. Buchta
- George B. Collins
- Felix Cornuschi
- Peter J. W. Debye
- Richard B. Dow
- Frank G. Dunnington
- Louis A. Gebhard
- Newell S. Gingrich
- Robert E. Holzer
- C. Rulon Jeppesen
- Elbe H. Johnson
- Jerome M. B. Kellogg
- Donald W. Kerst
- Harold J. Kersten
- Harry A. Kirkpatrick
- John G. Kirkwood
- J. K. Knipp
- R. S. Krishnan
- P. Kusch
- Spiro Kyropoulos
- Overton Luhr
- Sidney Millman
- Kenneth R. More
- Lyle W. Phillips
- Norman F. Ramsey
- Howard A. Robinson
- David Sinclair
- Chester M. Van Atta
- Clifford N. Wall
- Robert K. Waring
- Gleb Wataghin
- J. C. M. Whitaker
- Martin D. Whitaker

== 1941 ==
- Vernon M. Albers
- Herbert L. Anderson
- Paul A. Anderson
- Alfredo Banos
- W. H. Barkas
- Clarence E. Bennett
- L. V. Berkner
- Francis Birch
- John P. Blewett
- T. W. Bonner
- Eugene T. Booth
- Paul L. Copeland
- William E. Danforth
- John P. Delaney
- Lewis A. Delsasso
- Charles S. Draper
- Harold E. Edgerton
- Walter M. Elsasser
- Immanuel Estermann
- Isidor Fankuchen
- Eugene Feenberg
- Ivan A. Getting
- G. Norris Glasoe
- Roy W. Goranson
- Malcolm H. Hebb
- Albert G. Hill
- J. O. Hirschfelder
- J. Warren Horton
- Henry G. Houghton
- Maurice L. Huggins
- Curtis J. Humphreys
- David R. Inglis
- Ellis A. Johnson
- Ralph P. Johnson
- Martin D. Kamen
- Ralph B. Kennard
- George E. Kimball
- R. W. P. King
- Robert Burnett King
- Harry V. Knorr
- James F. Kochlor
- Bernhard Kurrelmeyer
- Lawrence M. Langer
- David B. Langmuir
- L. Jackson Laslett
- Fritz London
- John R. Loufbourow
- Humboldt W. Leverenz
- Louis Malter
- L. Marton
- Maria Goeppert Mayer
- Dana P. Mitchell
- Nora M. Mohler
- Frank E. Myers
- Chaim L. Pekeris
- Boris Podolsky
- W. G. Pollard
- Edith H. Quimby
- Louis N. Ridenour
- Nathan Rosen
- Bruno Rossi
- Philip Rudnick
- Julian Schwinger
- Emilio Segre
- Lincoln G. Smith
- Lyman Spitzer
- Joyce C. Stearns
- Leo Szilard
- Abraham H. Taub
- Browder J. Thompson
- Gregory S. Timoshenko
- Edwin A. Uehling
- Charles W. Ufford
- Lloyd A. Young

== 1942 ==
- G. Antonoff
- J. M. Blair
- Leon Brillouin
- Frederick R. Hirsh
- C. T. Lane
- L. C. Marshall
- L. Marton
- Philip Rudnick
- R. Smoluchowski

== 1943 ==
- F. F. Cleveland
- Peter Pringsheim
- Dean Wolldridge

== 1944 ==
- J. S. Allen
- R. C. Burt
- Andrew Gemant
- James Hillier
- M. L. Huggins
- Andrew W. Lawson
- Egon Lorenz
- J. H. MacMillen
- Herman Francis Mark
- Emil Ott
- W. W. Salisbury
- Hans Staub
- W. E. Stephens
- W. T. Szymanowski
- Gregory Wannier

== 1945 ==
- Scott Anderson
- Harvey Brooks
- A. E. Caswell
- P. Y. Chou
- C. L. Critchfield
- P. C. Cross
- J. H. Dillon
- Philipp Frank
- G. L. Haller
- R. C. Herman
- K. L. Hertel
- J. A. Hipple
- Montgomery H. Johnson
- C. Lanczos
- J. L. Lawson
- W. J. Lyons
- Melvin Mooney
- Raymond Morgan
- Seth Neddermeyer
- K. A. Norton
- Harry Nyquist
- J. R. Pierce
- G. Plasczck
- N. Rashevsky
- H. J. Reich
- Arthur Roberts
- Ragmar Rollefson
- William E. Shoupp
- Sidney Siegel
- A. J. F. Siegert
- Theodore Soller
- N. H. Trytten
- L. A. Wood
- Dorothy Wrinch
- L. M. Young

== 1946 ==
- H. L. Andrews
- W. N. Arnquist
- E. Scott Barr
- H. H. Barshall
- L. L. Beranek
- W. H. Bostick
- Egon Bretscher
- T. B. Brown
- C. R. Burrows
- W. M. Cady
- Glen D. Camp
- B. Chance
- Ralph J. Christensen
- R. F. Christy
- L. J. Chu
- A. M. Clogston
- E. A. Coomes
- S. M. Dancoff
- J. M. Davies
- R. H. Dicke
- M. Eastham
- H. W. Emmons
- D. H. Ewing
- Richard Feynman
- T. L. Fowler
- Otto Frisch
- Darol Froman
- S. L. Gerhard
- Louis Goldstein
- D. T. Griggs
- Marshall Halloway
- J. Halpern
- Morton Hamermesh
- D. R. Hamilton
- A. O. Hanson
- E. L. Hudspeth
- D. J. Hughes
- W. H. Jordan
- Joseph Keller
- Gilbert W. King
- L. D. P. King
- Urner Liddel
- L. B. Linford
- P. E. Lloyd
- A. Longacre
- E. M. Lyman
- J. L. McKibben
- P. H. Miller
- J. Millman
- M. D. O'Day
- W. H. Pielemeier
- W. M. Preston
- Hugh Richard
- R. D. Richtmeyer
- F. F. Rieke
- B. W. Sargent
- E. G. Schnieder
- E. J. Schremp
- Glenn T. Seaborg
- M. M. Shapiro
- Rubby Sherr
- C. W. Sherwin
- Samuel Silver
- J. A. Simpson
- O. C. Simpson
- W. H. Souder
- Otto Struve
- G. F. Tape
- Richard Taschek
- F. E. Terman
- H. C. Torrey
- G. E. Valley
- Ernst Weber
- A. M. Weinberg
- Royal Weller
- C. A. Whitmer
- R. R. Wilson
- G. J. Young
- Theodore von Kármán

== 1947 ==
- Marius Bohun-Green
- Lyle Borst
- Ralph Bown
- W. W. Buechner
- N. D. Coggeshall
- Richard Courant
- Harry W. Fulbright
- P. S. Gill
- W. S. Havens
- Shuichi Kusaka
- A. S. Langsdorf
- Dan McLachlan
- E. P. Ney
- D. O. North
- F. W. Preston
- L. J. Rainwater
- T. A. Read
- H. K. Schilling
- Lennart Simons
- A. H. Snell
- A. Taylor
- Katharine Way
- W. A. Wildhack

== 1949 ==
- P. H. Abelson
- G. D. Adams
- E. S. Akeley
- J. G. Aston
- R. A. Becker
- F. J. Belinfante
- P. G. Bergmann
- Ernst Billig
- Ernst Bleuler
- R. H. Bolt
- H. A. Boorse
- D. K. Coles
- H. C. Corben
- E. Cruetz
- Maurice Desirant
- Martin Deutsch
- S. S. Dharmatti
- R. B. Duffield
- H. Y. Fan
- Herman Feshbach
- G. H. Fett
- Wolfgang Finkelnburg
- H. M. Foley
- J. G. Fox
- Gertrude Scharff Goldhaber
- C. D. Goodman
- Felix Gutmann
- H. D. Hagstrum
- R. O. Haxby
- R. D. Heidenrich
- Conyers Herring
- E. A. Hiedemann
- R. D. Hill
- J. V. Hughes
- Charles Kittel
- H. W. Koch
- W. E. Kock
- J. S. Koehler
- J. S. Laughlin
- Thomas Lauritsen
- J. W. Liska
- Frank Matossi
- R. J. Maurer
- K. G. McKay
- A. G. Meister
- W. O. Milligan
- G. E. Moore
- E. R. Piore
- K. S. Pitzer
- Henry Primakoff
- R. W. Pringle
- E. M. Pugh
- R. B. T. Roberts
- C. S. Robinson
- F. T. Rogers
- M. E. Rose
- R. G. Sachs
- M. B. Sampson
- A. L. Samuel
- R. D. Sard
- J. N. Shive
- L. S. Skaggs
- C. F. Squire
- A. M. Stone
- R. B. Sutton
- C. H. Townes
- Bernard Waldman
- E. A. Walker
- L. R. Walker
- A. H. White
- M. W. White
- R. G. Wilkinson
- Lincoln Wolfenstein
- Chien-Shiung Wu
- Oleg Yadoff
- H. J. Yearian
- Hideki Yukawa
- Sergio de Benedetti

== 1950 ==
- R. M. Bowie
- R. G. Breckenridge
- H. S. Brown
- R. J. Cashman
- E. C. Crittenden
- C. T. Elvey
- R. W. Engstrom
- Kasimir Fajans
- B. T. Feld
- L. L. Foldy
- Simon Freed
- R. Frerichs
- E. C. Gregg
- F. L. Hereford
- John J. Hopfield
- D. F. Hornig
- C. E. Mandeville
- Leona Marshall
- David Middleton
- H. A. Oetjen
- L. O. Olsen
- Frank Oppenheimer
- Ray Pepinsky
- D. M. Robinson
- H. W. Russell
- E. F. Shrader
- S. S. Sidhu
- A. L. Skylar
- J. S. Smart
- C. S. Smith
- J. W. Stout
- A. L. Turkevich
- L. C. Yuan

== 1951 ==
- R. Becker
- W. W. Beeman
- A. E. Benfield
- Seymour Bernstein
- Claude Cherrier
- J. E. Goldman
- S. K. Haynes
- Robert Hofstadter
- C. P. Keim
- R. H. Kent
- D. W. R. McKinley
- Erich Regener
- K. I. Roulston
- C. G. Shull
- William Vick Smith
- B. Vodar
- J. A. van der Akker

== 1952 ==
- A. L. Bennett
- Walter Betteridge
- F. E. Borgnis
- L. T. Bourland
- F. W. Brown
- C. S. Cook
- J. H. Coon
- J. G. Daunt
- W. L. Davidson
- F. E. Fox
- F. N. Frenkiel
- E. Gerjouy
- Elizabeth R. Graves
- R. E. Hillger
- P. S. Jastram
- H. F. Olson
- G. E. Pake
- M. H. Schrenk
- F. B. Shull
- J. H. Simons
- J. H. Webb
- A. O. Williams

== 1953 ==
- R. K. Adair
- H. V. Argo
- G. C. Baldwin
- F. D. Bennett
- W. W. Berning
- J. K. Bragg
- H. P. Broida
- S. C. Brown
- K. A. Brueckner
- F. P. Bundy
- J. T. Burwell
- R. K. Cook
- C. D. Coryell
- E. F. Cox
- G. J. Dienes
- W. R. Faust
- J. H. Frazer
- W. R. Fredrickson
- F. L. Friedman
- A. W. Friend
- W. F. Fry
- P. F. Gast
- W. M. Good
- M. A. Greenfield
- A. V. Haeff
- Jane H. Hall
- W. T. Ham
- E. F. Hammel
- Peter Havas
- M. L. Herlin
- B. L. Hicks
- J. P. Howe
- Henry Hurwitz
- C. K. Jen
- Erling Jensen
- R. S. Jessup
- Robert Karplus
- Don Kirkham
- E. H. Krause
- W. L. Kraushaar
- H. W. Lewis
- D. L. Lind
- R. S. Livingston
- J. M. Luttinger
- A. K. Mann
- E. Maxwell
- Andre Mercier
- Nicholas Metropolis
- K. Z. Morgan
- W. W. Mutch
- H. Q. North
- W. E. Ogle
- E. C. Okress
- H. M. Parker
- J. R. Pellam
- W. R. Perret
- G. T. Rado
- W. T. Read
- J. A. Sanderson
- O. H. Schmitt
- R. E. Schreiber
- A. H. Scott
- R. B. Scott
- Leo Seren
- H. S. Sommers
- F. H. Spedding
- R. W. Spence
- R. H. Stockmayer
- C. V. Strain
- M. W. P. Strandberg
- R. W. Thompson
- David Turnbull
- G. H. Vineyard
- K. M. Watson
- T. A. Welton
- F. E. Williams
- R. W. Williams
- R. E. Wilson
- J. R. Winckler
- P. A. Wolff
- Oleg Yadoff
- K. A. Yamakawa
- D. J. Zaffarano
- B. H. Zimm

== 1954 ==
- E. P. Blizard
- W. L. Brown
- A. D. Callihan
- W. N. English
- William A. Klemperer
- D. N. Kundu
- J. D. Kurbatov
- Kurt Lehovec
- F. K. McGowan
- S. O. Morgan
- S. Pasternack
- L. D. Roberts
- R. P. Shutt
- R. D. Spence
- R. L. Sproull
- R. K. Wangsness

== 1955 ==
- N. Bloembergen
- M. K. Brachman
- Owen Chamberlain
- R. A. Charpie
- B. L. Cohen
- J. N. Cooper
- C. L. Cowan
- S. H. Dike
- David Feldman
- J. D. Ferry
- L. H. Fisher
- Herbert Friedman
- Ronald Geballe
- A. N. Guthrie
- D. L. Hill
- R. D. Huntoon
- W. D. Knight
- W. B. Kunkel
- J. R. Macdonald
- M. L. Merritt
- D. J. Montgomery
- E. C. Nelson
- G. T. Pelsor
- J. H. Reynolds
- M. A. Ruderman
- W. W. Scanlon
- Arthur Schawlow
- Richard Tousey
- W. W. Van Roosbroeck
- G. L. Weissler
- Chen-Ning Yang
- Alexander Zucker
- Frederic de Hoffmann

== 1956 ==
- D. E. Alburger
- Rudolf Bechmann
- Hendrik Wade Bode
- R. Bowers
- G. L. Brownell
- C. D. Broyles
- R. H. Bube
- J. M. Burgers
- T. B. Cook
- J. G. Dash
- R. L. Dolecek
- W. K. Ergen
- Ugo Fano
- R. E. Fox
- C. Goldberg
- Max Goodrich
- B. R. Gossick
- S. N. Gupta
- C. D. Hause
- Frank Herman
- P. H. Keesom
- J. S. Levinger
- R. L. Longini
- E. F. Lowry
- A. R. Moore
- E. W. Mueller
- H. T. Nagamatsu
- L. S. Nergaard
- D. C. Peaslee
- J. A. Sauer
- S. A. Schaaf
- F. H. Shelton
- A. Simon
- P. L. Smith
- C. V. Stephenson
- Rohn Truell
- F. A. Valente
- W. D. Walker
- Aaron Wexler
- C. E. Wiegand

== 1957 ==
- Bernard M. Abraham
- L. T. Aldrich
- R. M. Badger
- William Band
- W. E. Bennett
- C. K. Bockelman
- Lowell M. Bollinger
- J. J. Brady
- E. C. Campbell
- W. B. Cheston
- W. A. Chupka
- J. D. Cobine
- Fritz Coester
- M. Y. Colby
- J. W. Dabbs
- R. N. Dexter
- W. C. Dunlap
- J. E. Evans
- W. M. Fairbank
- D. L. Falkoff
- S. E. Forbush
- A. T. Forrester
- M. H. Foss
- S. S. Friedland
- C. G. B. Garrett
- Nathan Ginsburg
- Leo Goldberg
- A. E. S. Green
- G. K. Groetzinger
- C. L. Hammer
- S. S. Hanna
- J. A. Harvey
- Richard J. Hayden
- W. J. Henderson
- D. C. Hess
- C. T. Hibdon
- Roger H. Hildebrand
- N. M. Hintz
- J. G. Hoffman
- R. E. Holland
- W. F. Hornyak
- V. W. Hughes
- Leon Katz
- Carl Kenty
- Chihiro Kikuchi
- R. H. Kingston
- J. D. Knight
- W. C. Koehler
- P. G. Koontz
- Dieter Kurath
- R. T. Lagemann
- E. E. Lampi
- Benjamin Lax
- I. L. Lebow
- E. G. Linder
- R. E. Meyerott
- Daniel W. Miller
- J. P. Mize
- C. D. Moak
- A. H. Morrish
- J. E. Nafe
- V. A. Nedzel
- Roger G. Newton
- R. E. Norberg
- Theodore B. Novey
- R. D. O'Neal
- G. J. Perlow
- E. W. Pike
- W. G. Proctor
- Sol Raboy
- E. G. Ramberg
- C. A. Reynolds
- J. M. Reynolds
- G. R. Ringo
- Shepard Roberts
- P. A. Rodgers
- Fritz Rohrlich
- Philip Rosen
- M. H. Ross
- W. T. Scott
- C. H. Shaw
- K. L. Sherman
- R. G. Shulman
- S. F. Singer
- R. C. Spencer
- P. H. Stelson
- S. T. Stephenson
- C. P. Swann
- K. R. Symon
- L. C. Teng
- M. M. Ter-Pogossian
- Alvin V. Tollestrup
- Douglas M. Van Patter
- G. M. Volkoff
- A. W. Waltner
- D. T. Warren
- R. T. Webber
- Bernard Weinstock
- P. B. Weisz
- H. L. Welsh
- M. K. Wilkinson
- H. B. Willard
- Herman Yagoda
- Aristid von Grosse

== ƒ1958 ==
- Harry C. Allen
- Ernest Ambler
- Nicholas G. Anton
- Zoltan L. Bay
- David B. Beard
- Alden B. Bestul
- Robert T. Beyer
- Felix H. Boehm
- Lewis M. Branscomb
- Philip J. Bray
- Gerald E. Brown
- Randall S. Caswell
- Rodney Lee Cool
- Lawrence M. Cranberg
- Raymond Davis
- Vernon H. Dibeler
- Antonio Ferri
- Alan D. Franklin
- Joe L. Franklin
- H. P. R. Frederikse
- Everett G. Fuller
- R. H. Good
- Martin Greenspan
- Evans Hayward
- Raymond W. Hayward
- Charles M. Herzfeld
- John D. Hoffman
- Ralph P. Hudson
- Herbert Jehle
- M. Z. Krzywoblocki
- Herbert Leaderman
- D. E. Mann
- Robert S. Marvin
- A. Turner McPherson
- Robert W. Morse
- Joseph W. Motz
- Irwin Oppenheim
- C. H. Page
- Howard H. Seliger
- Andrew W. Sunyar
- Harold O. Wyckoff
- Jules R. de Launey

== 1959 ==
- Henri Amar
- Isadore Amdur
- Robert L. Anthony
- Norman Austern
- W. Carlisle Barber
- Charles A. Barnes
- Charles W. Beckett
- Benjamin Bederson
- Stephan Berko
- Lawrence R. Bickford
- Manfred A. Biondi
- Cornelius P. Browne
- Nicolas Cabrera
- Kenneth M. Case
- William Carter Dash
- Thomas M. Donahue
- Samuel N. Foner
- Richard G. Fowler
- Glenn M. Frye
- John L. Gammel
- Donald A. Glaser
- G. Robert Gunther-Mohr
- Paul V. C. Hough
- Lloyd P. Hunter
- Robert Jastrow
- Frederic Keffer
- Karl G. Kessler
- Samuel Krimm
- John J. Lambe
- Rolf W. Landauer
- W. Wallace McCormick
- Thomas R. McGuire
- John A. McIntyre
- A. G. McNish
- Franz R. Metzger
- John W. Mihelich
- Walter C. Miller
- David Mintzer
- Roger Newman
- Hugh C. Paxton
- Arthur V. Phelps
- Robert W. Pidd
- John S. Plaskett
- Walter Ramberg
- Charles A. Randall, Jr
- Alfred G. Redfield
- David J. Rose
- Marshall Rosenbluth
- Mahendra S. Sodha
- John Wescott Stewart
- Robert M. Talley
- Winfield W. Tyler
- Lawrence J. Varnerin
- George P. Wachtell
- Richard F. Wallis
- Satosi Watanabe
- Walter D. Whitehead
- H. G. F. Wilsdorf
- Ralph A. Wolfe
- William E. Wright
- Chia-Shun Yih
- Donald R. Young

== 1960 ==
- John T. Agnew
- Joseph Ballam
- Richard G. Barnes
- Charles P. Bean
- Lawrence C. Biedenharn
- Joseph L. Birman
- George Birnbaum
- Frank J. Blatt
- Martin M. Block
- Richard C. Bradley
- Ivor Brodie
- James J. Brophy
- Laurie M. Brown
- Charles I. Browne
- Max E. Caspari
- Calvin M. Class
- E. Richard Cohen
- Michael Cohen
- W. Dale Compton
- George A. Cowan
- Donald C. Cronemeyer
- Michael Danos
- Robert B. Day
- B. C. Diven
- Jerome M. Dowling
- Raymond L. Driscoll
- Henry Ehrenreich
- Leo Esaki
- Edgar Everhart
- John C. Fisher
- B. C. Frazer
- Alexander N. Gerritsen
- Leonard Sidney Goodman
- Melvin B. Gottlieb
- Andrew Guthrie
- Thomas M. Hahn
- Marshall C. Harrington
- Edward W. Hart
- Richard L. Henkel
- Julius L. Jackson
- Evan O. Kane
- Werner Kanzig
- Narinder S. Kapany
- William Edward Keller
- Edward Haskel Kerner
- George B. Kistiakowsky
- Bennett Kivel
- Walter Kohn
- F. Ralph Kotter
- William E. Kreger
- Martin D. Kruskal
- Elliott J. Lawton
- Robert B. Leachman
- Tsung-Dao Lee
- Bowen Rado Leonard
- Harold Walter Lewis
- Sidney H. Liebson
- Archie Mahan
- J. Carson Mark
- Robert L. Mather
- Gordon W. McClure
- James W. McGrath
- Hans Meissner
- John Wesley Mitchell
- Ralph C. Mobley
- R. F. Mozley
- Frederick Van Name
- Henry Winston Newson
- G. K. O'Neill
- Vincent E. Parker
- Robert G. Parr
- Joseph E. Perry
- Murray Peshkin
- Gerald C. Phillips
- James Alfred Phillips
- Gerald S. Picus
- David Pines
- Robert L. Platzman
- R. Ronald Rau
- Leonard Reiffel
- Fred Linden Ribe
- Harold E. Rorschach
- Arnold Russek
- Vance L. Sailor
- George J. Schultz
- John D. Seagrave
- Sunil K. Sen
- Kurt E. Shuler
- A. Melvin Skellett
- Stephen J. Smith
- Robert Stratton
- Peter A. Sturrock
- Chan Mou Tehen
- James L. Thomas
- Moody C. Thompson
- Alen M. Thorndike
- Richard E. Trees
- Arthur G. Tweet
- George D. Watkins
- A. B. Weaver
- Joseph Weber
- Joseph Wenesser
- Philip G. Wilkinson
- Robert Marshall Williamson
- Andrew Wittkower
- John L. Yarnell
- Hubert P. Yockey

== 1961 ==
- Felix T. Adler
- Fay Ajzenberg-Selove
- Frederick G. Allen
- Giulio Ascoli
- Richard G. Barnes
- Douglas S. Billington
- D. Allan Bromley
- Frederick C. Brown
- Richard M. Brown
- Elias Burstein
- Bille C. Carlson
- Kuldip P. Chopra
- Kenneth C. Clark
- Eugene P. Cooper
- James H. Crawford
- Bryce S. DeWitt
- Jerome M. Dowling
- Martin H. Edwards
- Arthur A. Evett
- George Wells Farwell
- George Feher
- Joseph R. Feldmeier
- Wade L. Fite
- Sherman Frankel
- Hans Frauenfelder
- Theodore H. Geballe
- Alexander N. Gerritsen
- Edwin L. Goldwasser
- Leonard S. Goodman
- J. Mayo Greenberg
- Willy Haeberli
- Isaac Halpern
- Frank S. Ham
- Paul Handler
- Wendell G. Holladay
- John Richard Holmes
- J. David Jackson
- Boris A. Jacobsohn
- Ali Javan
- Cleland H. Johnson
- Evan O. Kane
- Paul G. Klemens
- Louis J. Koester
- Ulrich E. Kruse
- James M. Lafferty
- Leo S. Lavatelli
- Sam Legvold
- Alfred Leitner
- Paul Warren Levy
- Theodore Aaron Litovitz
- William Arthur Little
- John S. Luce
- Gerald W. Ludwig
- Archie Mahan
- Dillon E. Mapother
- Robert L. Mather
- David W. McCall
- Harold Mendlowitz
- Kazuhiko Nishijima
- Robert Novick
- Robert H. Parmenter
- David G. Ravenhall
- John M. Richardson
- G. Raymond Satchler
- Richard Schlegel
- Fred H. Schmidt
- John Robert Schrieffer
- Walter Selove
- Richard G. Seyler
- David P. Shoemaker
- Ralph O. Simmons
- William P. Slichter
- James H. Smith
- Stanley Cooper Snowdon
- James N. Snyder
- Charles P. Sonnett
- Rudolph M. Sternheimer
- Roger A. Strehlow
- Clayton A. Swenson
- Robb M. Thomson
- John S. Toll
- John Stewart Waugh
- Alfons Weber
- Joseph Weber
- Max T. Weiss
- John C. Wheatley
- Donald Robertson White
- Henry William Wyld
- Marvin Eugene Wyman

== 1962 ==
- Edward V. Ashburn
- Masao Atoji
- Robert Avery
- W. O. Baker
- John R. Banister
- S. H. Bauer
- George Bekefi
- George B. Benedek
- Joseph Berkovitz
- Jeremy Bernstein
- R. Bersohn
- Fred W. Billmeyer
- John S. Blair
- M. Bloom
- Stewart D. Bloom
- David Bodansky
- Charles H. Braden
- Thomas H. Braid
- Bertram N. Brockhouse
- Marx Brook
- Solomon J. Buchsbaum
- A. M. Bueche
- F. Bueche
- Frank P. Buff
- Bertram A. Calhoun
- Howard Earl Carr
- Edward F. Casassa
- John G. Castle
- Bellur S. Chandrasekhar
- Robert L. Chasson
- Wolfgang J. Choyke
- Eugene L. Church
- Frederic H. Coensgen
- Stirling A. Colgate
- Eugene P. Cooper
- Lester M. Corliss
- Bryce L. Crawford
- C. F. Curtiss
- Richard H. Dalitz
- Sperry E. Darden
- Norman R. Davidson
- Thomas W. De Witt
- J. C. Decius
- Hans G. Dehmelt
- Joseph F. Dillon
- Malcolm Dole
- Kurt Dressler
- Harry G. Drickamer
- John F. Eichelberger
- Werner S. Emmerich
- Gert Erlich
- Andrew H. Eschenfelder
- Edwin R. Fitzgerald
- Marshall Fixman
- Paul A. Flinn
- Paul J. Flory
- Simon Foner
- Thomas G. Fox
- George K. Fraenkel
- Simeon A. Friedberg
- Edward A. Frieman
- Harold A. Gersch
- Stanley Geschwind
- Julian H. Gibbs
- John B. Goodenough
- Barry S. Gourary
- Harry E. Gove
- Wayland C. Griffith
- G. Richard Grove
- H. S. Gutowsky
- Robert N. Hall
- N. Bruce Hannay
- William R. Haseltine
- Julius M. Hastings
- Louis C. Hebel
- Warren Heckrotte
- F. T. Hedgcock
- J. de Heer
- Ernest M. Henley
- Dudley R. Herschbach
- Nicolas Inchauspe
- Vincent Jaccarino
- Israel S. Jacobs
- Nelson Jarmie
- Howard S. Jarrett
- Peter D. Johnson
- Thomas A. Kaplan
- Allan N. Kaufman
- H. Douglas Keith
- Charles N. Kelber
- Robert W. Keyes
- Robert S. Knox
- George F. Koster
- Leslie S. G. Kovasznay
- William R. Krigbaum
- Arnold M. Kuethe
- John Eugene Kunzler
- Eugene J. Lauer
- Robert D. Lawson
- David R. Lide
- C. C. Lin
- Seymour J. Lindenbaum
- Walter B. Loewenstein
- Conrad L. Longmire
- Jere Johns Lord
- Alexander D. MacDonald
- Hershel Markovitz
- Walter C. Marshall
- Ludwig J. Mayer
- Donald S. McClure
- James W. Meadows
- Clarence R. Mehl
- Arthur Clayton Menius
- R. E. Merrifield
- Eugen Merzbacher
- Frederick John Milford
- Glenn H. Miller
- Marvin H. Mittleman
- Raymond L. Murray
- John R. Neighbours
- A. Wilson Nolle
- Normal Lee Oleson
- Eugene Parker
- Stanford S. Penner
- Martin Peter
- Herbert R. Philipp
- W. D. Phillips
- Gilbert J. Plain
- Alan M. Portis
- Richard F. Post
- Emerson W. Pugh
- Marguerite M. Rogers
- Norman Rostoker
- Klaus Ruedenberg
- Matthew Sands
- Hiroshi Sato
- John P. Schiffer
- Melvin Schwartz
- Arthur Schwarzschild
- Benjamin Segall
- Howard A. Shugart
- John Arol Simpson
- Glen A. Slack
- John C. Slonczewski
- Edward G. Spencer
- Martin Stearns
- Richard S. Stein
- Ernest J. Sternglass
- Thomas H. Stix
- George Sudarshan
- Paul M. Sutton
- Morris Tanenbaum
- George B. Thurston
- George Thomas Trammell
- Douglas Venable
- Ernest K. Warburton
- Sir Robert Watson-Watt
- Gunther K. Wertheim
- Edgar F. Westrum
- Robert L. White
- Lawrence Wilets
- Richard Wilson
- Louis Witten
- L. D. Wyly

== 1963 ==
- William Parker Alford
- John M. Anderson
- Peter Louis Auer
- George A. Baker
- Samuel Jarvis Bame
- Klaus H. Behrndt
- Converse Herrick Blanchard
- Eugene I. Blount
- Martin Blume
- Dan I. Bolef
- Mark Bolsterli
- Earl R. Callen
- Richard O. Carlson
- Shang-Yi Ch'en
- Leon N. Cooper
- James Watson Cronin
- William Culshaw
- William D. Davis
- John A. Dillon
- Harry Dreicer
- John J. Dropkin
- Marvin Emerson Ebel
- Charles Elbaum
- John R. Eshbach
- Howard W. Etzel
- James M. Ferguson
- Sidney Fernbach
- C. M. Fowler
- Arthur J. Freeman
- Charles J. Gallagher
- Jagadish B. Garg
- John J. Gilvarry
- I. I. Glass
- Maurice Glicksman
- Charles J. Goebel
- Louis Gold
- Herbert Goldstein
- Myron L. Good
- J. Charles Grosskreutz
- Everett Mark Hafner
- Donald Hagerman
- Gordon E. Hansen
- Eugene Helfand
- Heinz K. Henisch
- George Wheeler Hinman
- Clyde A. Hutchinson
- A. R. Hutson
- Suresh Chand Jain
- John A. Jungerman
- Jerome Karle
- George R. Keepin
- V. Paul Kenney
- Marvin E. Lasser
- Boris Leaf
- Bela A. Lengyel
- Leon J. Lidofsky
- Hans W. Liepmann
- Dudley T. F. Marple
- Kenneth B. McAfee
- Edward Melkonian
- Peter A. Moldauer
- Michael J. Moravcsik
- Donald R. Morey
- Henry Motz
- Rolf Karl Mueller
- John A. Northrop
- Susumu Okubo
- Jay Orear
- Richard Keut Osborn
- Lorne A. Page
- Harry Palevsky
- Russell A. Peck
- A. Peterlin
- Richard James Plano
- George W. Pratt
- Jerome S. Prener
- Earl W. Prohofsky
- Warren E. Quinn
- Herbert Rabin
- Arthur H. Rosenfeld
- Herbert B. Rosenstock
- George Rudinger
- Moti L. Rustgi
- Edward I. Salkovitz
- Nicholas P. Samios
- George A. Sawyer
- Raymond F. Sawyer
- Albert I. Schindler
- Guenter Schwartz
- Ruth Fitzmayer Schwarz
- Arthur Schwarzchild
- Anatole M. Shapiro
- Raymond Kay Sheline
- Zaka I. Slawsky
- Bernard Smaller
- Felix T. Smith
- George F. Smith
- David P. Stevenson
- Frank H. Stillinger
- Thomas F. Stratton
- Otmar Michael Stuetzer
- James Terrell
- Otto Theimer
- Sam Bard Treiman
- Thomas L. Weatherly
- Romayne F. Whitmer
- Joel Q. Williams
- William J. Willis
- William W. Wood
- Thomas J. Ypsilantis
- P. F. Zweifel

== 1964 ==
- Elihu Abrahams
- John D. Anderson
- C. H. Bachman
- Samuel Jarvis Bame
- Saul Barshay
- Earl C. Beaty
- Albert C. Beer
- Ted G. Berlincourt
- Richard Blankenbecler
- Rubin Braunstein
- Robert Melvin Brugger
- Manuel Cardona
- Herman Y. Carr
- Thomas Ripley Carver
- Henderson Cole
- Arthur C. Damask
- David B. Dutton
- Norman Einspruch
- Thomas L. Estle
- James A. Fay
- Val Logsdon Fitch
- Harry Lloyd Frisch
- Philip H. Geil
- Sydney Geltman
- G. W. Gobeli
- George Warren Griffing
- Leonard I. Grossweiner
- Lester Guttman
- Richard A. Hake
- Russell LaVerne Heath
- Kenneth W. Hedberg
- Douglas J. Henderson
- Warren Elliott Henry
- Roland Francis Herbst
- J. Ross Heverly
- Robert M. Hill
- F. Hubbard Horn
- Hans Jaffe
- Robert George Jahn
- Piyare Lal Jain
- Walter John
- William G. Johnston
- William L. Kehl
- Arthur K. Kerman
- Clarence F. Kooi
- Ralph W. Krone
- Murray A. Lampert
- Cecil Eldon Leith
- Aaron Lemonick
- John Linsley
- Alfred U. MacRae
- Edward Allen Mason
- Satish C. Mathur
- F. Albert Matsen
- Ian E. McCarthy
- Hugh McManus
- Henry Lewis McMurry
- Alan L. McWhorter
- Mael A. Melvin
- Roger C. Millikan
- Michael Stanley Moore
- Robert Alexander Naumann
- Richard C. Nelson
- Arthur H. Nethercot
- Theodore George Northrop
- Elio Passaglia
- P. James Peebles
- Charles P. Poole
- Robert H. Rediker
- Charles William Reich
- Ronald M. Rockmore
- Adam F. Schuch
- Lawrence M. Slifkin
- Thor L. Smith
- Peter P. Sorokin
- M. C. Steele
- Alec T. Stewart
- Swaminatha Sundaram
- Dale T. Teaney
- Georges M. Temmer
- David Gilbert Thomas
- Richard N. Thomas
- William W. True
- Arthur Strong Wightman
- Howard A. Wilcox
- Rolf G. Winter
- James P. Wittke
- E. J. Zimmerman

== 1965 ==
- Hack Arroe
- Dana K. Bailey
- Clarence Franklin Barnett
- Stanley Bashkin
- Robert Thomas Bate
- Richard B. Bernstein
- Jacob Bigeleisen
- John S. Blakemore
- Leon Blitzer
- Edward F. Carome
- W James Carr
- Tien Sun Chang
- Lloyd F. Chase
- Philip Wylie Coulter
- Jack W. Culvahouse
- Arthur C. Damask
- John P. Davidson
- Edward E. Donaldson
- Ronald D. Edge
- Arno Wilford Ewald
- Vincent J. Folen
- Thomas Kenneth Fowler
- Wolfgang Franzen
- Robert J. Friauf
- Fausto G. Fumi
- R. H. Garstang
- W. F. Gauster
- Samuel Dwight Gehman
- Andrew V. Gold
- Paul Goldhammer
- Charles D. Goodman
- Claude G. Grenier
- Gordon E. Gross
- Richard A. Gudmundsen
- John B. Gunn
- Melvyn L. Halbert
- Edward G. Harris
- Mark Harrison
- Marvin Hass
- Eastman N. Hatch
- Gabriel Frederick Herrmann
- J. Ross Heverly
- D. K. Holmes
- John Thomas Howe
- Arthur Huechman
- Richard W. Huggett
- Joseph L. Hunter
- William G. Johnston
- Joyce J. Kaufman
- William L. Kehl
- Seymour P. Keller
- George G. Kelley
- William J. Kerman
- Rappal S. Krishnan
- Behram Kursunolgu
- Norman H. Lazar
- Aleksander Lempicki
- Chun Chia Lin
- Samuel H. Liu
- Ralph A. Logan
- Per-Olov Lowdin
- Herbert Grenfeld MacPherson
- Malcolm H. Macfarlane
- Allan R. Mackintosh
- Hormoz M. Mahmoud
- T. H. Maiman
- Saul Meiboom
- Roy Middleton
- Robert G. Morris
- Marcel W. Muller
- B. A. Munir
- Marshall I. Nathan
- William F. Nelson
- Bishan P. Nigam
- K. Carl Nomura
- Masaru Ogawa
- William C. Overton
- F. J. Padden
- Edward D. Palik
- Edgar A. Pearlstein
- Ronald F. Peierls
- Clive Howe Perry
- Richard L. Petritz
- George C. Pimentel
- Maurice H. L. Pryce
- Derek L. Pursey
- V. K. Rasmussen
- David Redfield
- David M. Ritson
- Radha R. Roy
- L. Worth Seagondollar
- Norman Steven Shiren
- Robert T. Siegel
- Thoma M. Snyder
- Frank Stern
- Ellen S. Stewart
- Robert Stump
- Miroslav Synek
- Stephen Tamor
- Sidney Teitler
- William Tobocman
- Carl Tomizuka
- M. Elaine Toms
- Carroll C. Trail
- Sol Triebwasser
- William J. Turner
- M. S. Wechsler
- S. I. Weissman
- John W. Weymouth
- Kenneth A. Wickersheim
- Clara Johanne Doris Wilsdorf
- Gordon G. Wiseman
- James C. Wu
- F. W. Young

== 1966 ==
- Leland C. Allen
- Rodney D. Andrews
- Petros N. Argyres
- Hack Arroe
- Arthur Ashkin
- Asim O. Barut
- James H. Becker
- Ira B. Bernstein
- Avadh B. Bhatia
- Leon Blitzer
- Sidney A. Bludman
- Wesley E. Brittin
- Kenneth J. Button
- Richard R. Carlson
- Sydney Chapman
- Charles E. Chase
- Bertran W. Downs
- Gene F. Dresselhaus
- Wiliam E. Drummond
- William P. Dumke
- Ronald K. Eby
- David Olaf Edwards
- Stanley C. Fultz
- Eugene Goldberg
- James P. Gordon
- Roy W. Gould
- Robert A. Gross
- Harold P. Hanson
- N. J. Harrick
- Edward G. Harris
- Bernard G. Harvey
- Robert A. Hein
- Arthur Herschman
- Robert E. Howard
- Darrell S. Hughes
- Julian F. Johnson
- Nicola N. Khuri
- Ernest D. Klema
- Noemie Koller
- Jack J. Kraushaar
- Kenneth Lande
- Donald Newton Langenberg
- Howard J. Laster
- Joel L. Lebowitz
- G. W. Lehman
- Edgar Lipworth
- T. H. Maiman
- Jerry B. Marion
- Hans Mark
- John C. Mavroides
- Osman K. Mawardi
- Jacob Mazur
- John McElhinney
- Siegfried J. Methfessel
- James E. Monahan
- Robert Nathans
- Leo J. Neuringer
- Clayton E. Olsen
- David I. Paul
- Aihud Pevsner
- Sergio P. S. Porto
- Vasant R. Potnis
- Francis W. Prosser
- John J. Quinn
- K. Narahari Rao
- Paul Rappaport
- Herbert Spencer Ribner
- William W. Robertson
- Mykola Saporoschenko
- Richard C. Sapp
- Douglas J. Scalapino
- Engelbert L. Schuking
- Gen Shirane
- Benjamin D. Silverman
- Rolf Sinclair
- Katsumi Tanaka
- Peter E. Tannenwald
- Jerome J. Tiemann
- Arthur Victor Tobolsky
- George L. Trigg
- Roger H. Walmsley
- Benjamin Welber
- Herbert J. Zeiger
- Alfred J. Zmuda
- Frits K. du Pre

== 1967 ==
- Benjamin Abeles
- Harold M. Agnew
- Ralph D. Amado
- Betsy Ancker-Johnson
- Orson LaMar Anderson
- Leonid V. Azaroff
- Marshall Baker
- George I. Bell
- William R. Bennett Jr.
- Daniel Bershader
- Karl W. Boer
- Rollon O. Bondelid
- Leo Brewer
- Authur A. Broyles
- Rolf Buchdahl
- Gerald Burns
- J. W. Cable
- George D. Cody
- Hans Otto Cohn
- Robert V. Coleman
- James W. Corbett
- Allan M. Cormack
- John M. Dawson
- Warren DeSorbo
- Arwin A. Dougal
- James E. Drummond
- Thomas H. Dupree
- Thomas Erber
- Marc R. Feix
- Richard A. Ferrell
- Richard L. Fork
- James B. Gerhart
- John H. Gibbons
- Joseph A. Girodmaine
- David E. Golden
- Jack S. Greenberg
- Hans R. Griem
- Piet C. Gugelot
- Hershel J. Hausman
- John C. Hensel
- Joseph H. Hirschberg
- Gerald J. Holton
- Richard E. Honig
- David W. Joseph
- Sidney H. Kahana
- Daniel E. Kaplan
- Young B. Kim
- G. C. Knollman
- Walter S. Koski
- J. J. Lander
- Howard J. Laster
- Benjamin W. Lee
- Richard H. Levy
- Don B. Litchenberg
- W. H. T. Loh
- Jere J. Lord
- Richard L. Macklin
- Leon Madansky
- Robert P. Madden
- Meinhard E. Mayer
- Kathryn A. McCarthy
- Dean E. McCumber
- Earl W. McDaniel
- Frank B. McDonald
- Carver A. Mead
- Sydney Meshkov
- Herbert L. Mette
- Walter E. Millett
- Francis J. Morin
- R. B. Murray
- Albert Narath
- Jacques I. Pankove
- Chandra K. N. Patel
- Richard M. Patrick
- Harry E. Petschek
- Sergio P. S. Porto
- John O. Rasmussen
- Robert Resnick
- Martin E. Rickey
- Peter H. Rose
- Gerald Harris Rosen
- Bruce Rosenblum
- Laura M. Roth
- Jack Sandweiss
- Alvin M. Saperstein
- Edwin J. Schillinger
- James E. Schirber
- Richard E. Schmunk
- Jack Schneps
- Alexander G. Smith
- George A. Snow
- Edward Sonder
- William E. Spicer
- George C. Sponsler
- Edward A. Stern
- George W. Stroke
- Hiroshi Suura
- James C. Swihart
- Horace D. Taft
- Jerome J. Tiemann
- Thomas A. Tombrello
- Paul Urban
- Joseph T. Vanderslice
- Duane C. Wallace
- Roger H. Walmsley
- Roy Weinstein
- Richard Williams
- Harvey Winston
- Peter J. Wojtowicz
- Eligius A. Wolicki
- Yako Yafet
- Frederik W. deWette

== 1968 ==
- Berni J. Alder
- Igor Alexeff
- Roy S. Anderson
- Sigurd Arajs
- Morrel P. Bachynski
- Manoj K. Banerjee
- Michel Baranger
- Lawrence Sims Bartell
- Gilbert Alfred Bartholomew
- George B. Beard
- Abraham Bers
- Robert W. Birge
- James Daniel Bjorken
- Ingram Bloch
- Henry Gabriel Blosser
- Robert R. Borchers
- Werner Brandt
- Harold C. Britt
- Lowell S. Brown
- Oscar Buneman
- Richard A. Chapman
- Francis F. Chen
- Donald Delbert Clayton
- Bernard R. Cooper
- Bruch Cork
- Paul P. Craig
- Richard Edwin Cutkosky
- R. A. Dandl
- Robert H. Davis
- Thomas B. Day
- Malcolm Derrick
- Robert M. Eisberg
- Melvin Eisner
- Bent Elbek
- Herbert Aaron Elion
- Arnold Engler
- Cavid Erginsoy
- Thomas Henry Fields
- Willis H. Flygare
- Vincent J. Folen
- Harold Forstat
- Alan Bicksler Fowler
- Wiliam B. Fowler
- John David Fox
- Daniel R. Frankl
- John Stiles Fraser
- Herbert M. Fried
- M Andre Gallmann
- Aaron I. Galonsky
- Ivar Giaever
- Norman K. Glendenning
- Rolfe E. Glover
- Serge Gorodetzky
- Michael Anthony Grace
- Robert Lockhart Graham
- John M. Greene
- James J. Griffin
- Robert Budington Griffiths
- Donald J. Grove
- Joseph H. Hamilton
- Walter A. Harrison
- Robert D. Hatcher
- Hubert Heffner
- Wilmont N. Hess
- Jay L. Hirshfield
- Harry D. Holmgren
- William Coffeen Holton
- Raymond H. Hughes
- John R. Huizenga
- George J. Igo
- John L. Johnson
- Tudor W. Johnston
- Ernest A. Jones
- Keith W. Jones
- Alfred S. Joseph
- Arthur R. Kantrowitz
- Arnold M. Karo
- Ralph W. Kavanagh
- Emil Kazes
- William H. Kelly
- Leroy T. Kerth
- Ralph W. Kilb
- Gordon S. Kino
- Leonard S. Kisslinger
- Claude A. Klein
- Otto Mogens Kofoed-Hansen
- Nicholas A. Krall
- Aron Kupperman
- Thaddeus F. Kycia
- James Stephen Langer
- Robert Lanou
- Leon M. Lederman
- William W. Lichten
- Paul H. Lindenmeyer
- William H. Louisell
- William M. MacDonald
- S. W. MacDowell
- Rudolph A. Marcus
- Paul C. Martin
- Ronald Lavern Martin
- James E. McCune
- John P. McKelvey
- James E. Mercereau
- Donald H. Miller
- Philip Dixon Miller
- John Charles Douglas Milton
- Charles W. Misner
- Robert K. Nesbet
- Carl R. Oberman
- Tihiro Ohkawa
- Sadao Oneda
- Frank J. Padden
- Paul M. Parker
- Laurence Passell
- George Algis Paulikas
- Stanley J. Pickart
- Dan Q. Posin
- Herman Postma
- Melvin Alexander Preston
- Albert G. Prodell
- Benton Seymour Rabinovitch
- William A. Reed
- Rufus H. Ritchie
- George W. Robinson
- Mark Tabor Robinson
- Lauren Sidney Rodberg
- Charles E. Roos
- Carl Albert Rouse
- Nathan Rynn
- Robert Thornton Schumacher
- Ralph Ernest Segel
- William Arthur Sibley
- Peter S. Signell
- James E. Simmons
- Ronald J. Sladek
- Harold Glenn Smith
- Louis D. Smullin
- Charles M. Sommerfield
- Raymond Andrew Sorensen
- Larry Spruch
- Richard H. Stokes
- H. Henry Strokes
- Joseph Sucher
- Ravindra N. Sudan
- Taro Tamura
- Wiliam B. Thompson
- Edward H. Thorndike
- Derek A. Tidman
- Walter J. Tomasch
- Arnold M. Toxen
- Alvin W. Trivelpiece
- Edrie Dale Trout
- Narkis Tzoar
- Hiroomi Umezawa
- Erich W. Vogt
- Kameshwar C. Wali
- N. Sanders Wall
- G. King Walters
- Maurice B. Webb
- Marvin John Weber
- Peter P. Wegener
- Harvey E. Wegner
- William A. Wenzel
- Peter J. Westervelt
- Robert G. Wheeler
- Mildred Widgoff
- Thomas A. Wiggins
- Denys Haight Wilkinson
- Richard Frost Wood
- Truman O. Woodruff
- Leo Yaffe
- Gaurang B. Yodh
- Shoichi Yoshikawa

== 1969 ==
- Abashian Alexander
- Robert Clyde Amme
- Ansel Cochran Anderson
- George Thomson Armstrong
- Anthony Arrott
- Manuel Aven
- John D. Axe
- John N. Bahcall
- A. S. Barker
- Boris W. Batterman
- Gordon Alan Baym
- Everet Hess Beckner
- Hans Bichsel
- Edward G. Bilpuch
- Henry V. Bohm
- Norman Ewart Booth
- Walter E. Bron
- Edmond Brown
- Joseph Callaway
- R. G. Chambers
- Roger Chang
- Chellis Chasman
- Kasturi Lal Chopra
- Robert Edward Chrien
- Nicholas C. Christofilos
- Talbot Albert Chubb
- Richard S. Claassen
- Marvin L. Cohen
- Barnett C. Cook
- Gilbert R. Cook
- Jerry A. Cowen
- Herman Z. Cummins
- Richard Winslow Damon
- Tara Prasad Das
- Sheldon Datz
- Wiliam Robert Davis
- Jean-Loup Delcroix
- Samuel Devons
- Edmund Armond Dimarzio
- Douglas J. Donahue
- David H. Douglass
- Joseph Dresner
- Charles B. Duke
- Guy T. Emery
- Leopoldo M. Falicov
- Bruce J. Faraday
- John Gabriel Fetkovich
- Herman Joseph Fink
- Douglas K. Finnemore
- Robert Louis Fleischer
- Peter Fong
- Frank Andrew Franz
- Stanley C. Freden
- Ronald Fuchs
- Andrew Leroy Gardner
- Walter M. Gibson
- Donald Maurice Ginsberg
- David Tobias Goldman
- Ulrich Gonser
- Bernard Goodman
- Gordon L. Goodman
- Andrew Vincent Granato
- Thomas A. Green
- Gareth E. Guest
- Theodore C. Harman
- Sven R. Hartmann
- Eastman N. Hatch
- Alan Jay Heeger
- Volker Heine
- David L. Hendrie
- Leland Edgar Holloway
- William G. Hoover
- John J. Hopfield
- Robert D. Hudson
- Horia Hulubei
- A. Jayaraman
- Harold Johnston
- Leo Philip Kadanoff
- George R. Kalbfleisch
- Walter R. Kane
- Edwin Kashy
- Peter E. Kaus
- David T. Keating
- Bruce Reginald F. Kendall
- William J. Kernan
- John B. Ketterson
- John Killeen
- Ottmar C. Kistner
- Miles Vincent Klein
- Alfred Lande
- Raymond O. Lane
- Simon Larach
- Kenneth E. Lassila
- Carl A. Levinson
- George G. Libowitz
- Max R. Lorenz
- Terry Lee Loucks
- Ralph H. Lovberg
- Malcolm H. MacGregor
- Heinz Maier-Leibnitz
- Edward Raymond Manring
- Hugh J. Martin
- L. F. Mattheiss
- Thomas King McCubbin
- William L. McMillan
- N. David Mermin
- Julian Malcolm Miller
- Knox Millsaps
- Shashanka S. Mitra
- David Campbell Montgomery
- Aram Mooradian
- Joseph Morgan
- Rudolf L. Mossbauer
- Lewis H. Nosanow
- Philippe P. Nozieres
- Robert Francis O'Connell
- Thomas A. O'Halloran
- William J. O'Sullivan
- Felix Edward Obenshain
- Satoshi Ozaki
- Arthur Paskin
- James M. Peek
- Morris L. Perlman
- P. S. Pershan
- William T. Pinkston
- Philip M. Platzman
- Richard E. Prange
- Paul B. Price
- David C. Rahm
- Anant K. Ramdas
- John H. Reisner
- Paul L. Richards
- Sergio Rodriguez
- Paul Roman
- John M. Rowell
- M. Eugene Rudd
- Henri S. Sack
- James A. R. Samson
- Laird Delbert Schearer
- Paul Hermann Scherrer
- Harold W. Schmitt
- Sheldon Schultz
- Richard L. Schwoebel
- Franklin R. Scott
- George M. Seidel
- Bernhard O. Seraphin
- Prithe Paul Singh
- Abraham Sosin
- William O. Statton
- Boris P. Stoicheff
- George Clarck Summerfield
- Harry William Taylor
- Kenneth J. Teegarden
- Vigdor L. Teplitz
- Frank Turkot
- Thomas J. Turner
- Herbert M. Uberall
- Jack Leon Uretsky
- Charles E. Violet
- Seymour H. Vosko
- Kurt Weiser
- N. Richard Werthamer
- R. Stephen White
- Calvin Wong
- John M. Worlock
- Philip J. Wyatt
- Avivi Israel Yavin

== 1970 ==
- Turner Alfrey
- Thomas Lee Bailey
- Bruce H. Billings
- Arnold L. Bloom
- Martin G. Broadhurst
- Philip G. Burke
- Joseph Cheng-Yih Chen
- Richard D. Deslattes
- Gordon H. Dunn
- Adi Eisenberg
- Eldon Earl Ferguson
- George B. Field
- Traugott E. Fischer
- Murray Geller
- Forrest R. Gilmore
- Martin Goldstein
- Laszlo J. Gutay
- William Happer
- John W. Hooper
- George Samuel Hurst
- Frederick R. Innes
- Mitio Inokuti
- George D. Kahl
- Frederick Kaufman
- Hans Kleinpoppen
- Manfred O. Krause
- Chris E. Kuyatt
- Frederick W. Lampe
- Robert F. Landel
- John I. Lauritzen
- George M. Lawrence
- Kenneth R. Lea
- William C. Martin
- J. William McGowan
- H. Harvey Michels
- Lyman Mower
- Earle E. Muschlitz
- Lawrence E. Nielsen
- Richard M. Noyes
- Thomas F. O'Malley
- Stephan Ormonde
- Hendrik J. Oskam
- James R. Peterson
- Roger S. Porter
- Darrell H. Reneker
- S. Peter Rosen
- Arthur L. Schmeltekopf
- Arnold L. Smith
- Daniel J. Sperber
- Richard M. Stern
- Aaron Temkin
- Kip S. Thorne
- Robert Ullman
- John F. Waymouth
- Benjamin Widom
- Wolfgang Lothar Wiese
- Bernhard Wunderlich
- Norman J. Zabusky
- Richard Zare

== 1971 ==
- Guenter Ahlers
- Louis W. Anderson
- David Bartlett
- Paul A. Beck
- Arthur I. Bienenstock
- Howard K. Birnbaum
- Thomas H. Blewitt
- Charles D. Bowman
- F. Paul Brady
- Alan D. Brailsford
- John A. Brinkman
- James C. Browne
- Curtis G. Callan
- Gerald G. Comisar
- John Cooper
- Roger E. DeWames
- Stanley Deser
- James R. Durig
- Judah M. Eisenberg
- Lothar W. Frommhold
- Solomon Gartenhaus
- Alfred E. Glassgold
- Eugene Haddad
- Lawrence A. Harris
- Claude W. Horton
- Hugh P. Kelly
- Leonard Kleinman
- Martin Lessen
- Theodore E. Madey
- Lloyd Godfrey Mann
- Daniel Mattis
- Marcus T. McEllistrem
- Robert J. McNeal
- Harry Lee Morrison
- Yuval Ne'eman
- Raymond L. Orbach
- Albert W. Overhauser
- Robert L. Park
- Francis Pichanik
- Francis Pipkin
- John R. Reitz
- Donald C. Reynolds
- Thor N. Rhodin
- Howard Schnitzer
- Eric Sheldon
- Robert E. Stickney
- Lynwood W. Swanson
- Robert W. Terhune
- Steven Weinberg
- Charles A. Wert
- Harry I. West

== See also ==
- List of American Physical Society Fellows (1972–1997)
- List of American Physical Society Fellows (1998–2010)
- List of American Physical Society Fellows (2011–)
