= Paul Frederick Zweifel =

Mathematical physicist (b. 1929, d. 2017)

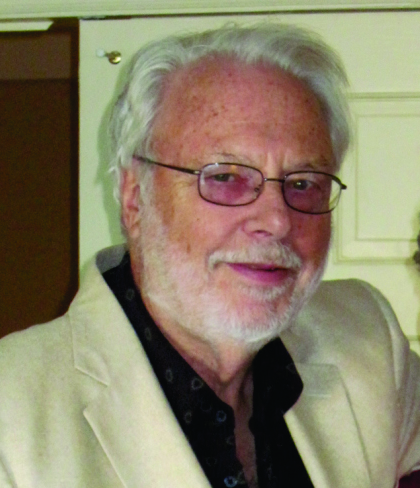
- Born: June 21, 1929; New York City
- Died: February 12, 2017 (aged 87)
- Education: Duke University (Ph.D.)
- Known for: Mathematical theory of nuclear reactors
- Awards: American Physical Society Fellowship (1963); Ernest Orlando Lawrence Award (1972); Guggenheim Fellowship (1974)
- Scientific career
- Fields: Nuclear reactor physics; Radiative transfer; Transport theory; Statistical physics; Music Theory
- Workplaces: Knolls Atomic Power Laboratory; University of Michigan; Virginia Tech
- Thesis: Capture-Positron Branching Ratios (1954)
- Doctoral advisor: Eugene Greuling

Paul Frederick Zweifel (June 21, 1929 – February 12, 2017) was a mathematical physicist and a prominent leader in the mathematical theory of nuclear reactors and the mathematical development of linear transport theory, a discipline that encompasses neutron transport in the core of a nuclear reactor as well as the propagation of photons in radiative transfer.

In transport theory, he pioneered the use of rigorous mathematics for analytically solving the linear transport equation. He developed existence and uniqueness theorems for the neutron transport equation and investigated the spectrum of the linear transport operator under general conditions.

== Early years ==
Paul Zweifel was born on June 21, 1929, in New York City, to Dorothy and Frederick Zweifel. His family moved to Spartanburg, South Carolina. When he was fifteen, he received the Pepsi-Cola Scholarship to attend the college of his choice, Carnegie Institute of Technology (now Carnegie Mellon University), and graduated with a B.S. in Physics in 1948.

He received his Ph.D. in Physics in 1954 under the guidance of Eugene Greuling at Duke University.The title of his dissertation was Capture-Positron Branching Ratios. He was in the lineage of Ph.D. dissertation advisors, starting with Josef Stefan, Ludwig Boltzmann, Paul Ehrenfest, George Uhlenbeck, Emil Konopinski, E. Greuling, and P. F. Zweifel.

Zweifel worked at the Knolls Atomic Power Laboratory as a physicist and a manager of theoretical physics, where he did research on the theory of the slowing down and thermalization of neutrons from mid-1953 to 1958.

In 1958, he was appointed associate professor of nuclear engineering at the University of Michigan, and he was promoted to professor in 1960. He began working with Kenneth M. Case, a physicist who made pioneering contributions to neutron transport theory during the Manhattan Project. They published a monograph, Linear Transport Theory, in 1967 on the linear Boltzmann equation. The mathematical approach of Case and Zweifel enables a more direct solution to problems of the type analyzed by Boris Davison in his monograph Neutron Transport Theory and that of Subrahmanyan Chandrasekhar in his treatise Radiative Transfer.

In 1968, Paul became a Professor of Physics at Virginia Tech in Blacksburg, and three years later, he was appointed as University Distinguished Professor, the highest distinction a professor can attain there.

== Conferences ==
During a sabbatical year from the University of Michigan spent as a Visiting Professor at the Middle East Technical University in 1964–1965, Paul and physicist Erdal İnönü organized a two-week NATO Advanced Study Institute on Transport Theory held in Ankara, Turkey. The conference featured six established senior faculty from the United States, Germany, and Yugoslavia and was attended by junior faculty and advanced graduate students who spoke about their dissertation projects. The proceedings, edited by the conference organizers, were published in Developments in Transport Theory.

In 1969, Paul, along with Robert Erdmann and Charles Siewert, founded a series of conferences that have become known as the International Conference on Transport Theory, or ICTT meetings. The conferences continue to bring together experts in mathematical and applied transport theory from all parts of the world. As of 2024, there have been 27 meetings—none affiliated with any professional society—that were held in the United States, Italy, China, Brazil, Sweden, Russia, England, Hungary and France; Paul hosted six of the conferences in Blacksburg. The journal Transport Theory and Statistical Physics, or TTSP, with Paul as its founding editor from 1971 until 1981, has published the proceedings of many ICTT meetings; the journal was re-titled in 2014 to the Journal of Computational and Theoretical Transport in recognition of the growing popularity of numerical methods in transport theory.

== Publications ==
Paul Zweifel published in a variety of professional and nonprofessional fields, especially in reactor physics and neutron scattering, transport theory, and statistical physics.Although he began his career in the field of nuclear reactors, his interests evolved to mathematical physics in general. He also published a significant number of technical papers in other areas, especially on the theory of music.

He was the Ph.D. advisor of Joel H. Ferziger whose dissertation was The Theory of Neutron Slowing Down in Nuclear Reactors. Later, the authors turned that into a book of the same title, and Paul wrote a textbook entitled Reactor Physics.

== Honors ==
In 1972, he received from the United States Department of Energy the Ernest Orlando Lawrence Award. In 1974, he received a John Simon Guggenheim Foundation Fellowship. He was a Fellow of the American Physical Society since 1963, and had an obituary published in Physics Today.

== Later years ==
Paul Zweifel retired from Virginia Tech in 1996 but continued to publish professionally until 2014. Because he studied music beginning when he was four years old, took voice lessons as a youngster, and later performed as a vocalist, he taught an opera course at Virginia Tech after his retirement. He also established a business specialized in creating supertitles for opera companies nationwide. He and his wife supported Virginia Tech’s Moss Arts Center and endowed a scholarship to enable music students to participate in summer music festivals and professional development workshops.

He died on February 12, 2017, at the age of 87.
