= Samuel Krimm =

American biophysicist

- Born: October 19, 1925 (age 100); Morristown, New Jersey
- Education: Polytechnic Institute of Brooklyn (1947); Princeton University (1949, 1950)
- Awards: APS Fellow (1959); APS Polymer Physics Prize (1977); Humboldt Prize (1983)
- Scientific career
- Fields: Biophysics
- Workplaces: University of Michigan
- Doctoral students: Willie Hobbs Moore

Samuel Krimm (born October 19, 1925) is an American physicist with a research focus in biophysics (spectroscopy, macromolecules, protein folding). He is professor emeritus and research scientist emeritus at University of Michigan.

== Education ==
Krimm earned a BS in chemistry, from Polytechnic Institute of Brooklyn (1947), and MS and PhD in physical chemistry from Princeton University (1949, 1950).

== Career highlights ==
Krimm was elected fellow of the American Physical Society in 1959.

In 1977, Krimm received the American Physical Society's Polymer Physics Prize "For his outstanding experimental studies and theoretical developments in infrared and Ra-man spectroscopy and X-ray scattering from natural and synthetic polymers".

In 1983, he was awarded the Humboldt Prize.

From 1967-1972 he was doctoral advisor for Willie Hobbs Moore, who earned the first PhD in physics for an African-American woman at an American university.

He was the first Director of the University of Michigan Program in Protein Structure and Design, created in 1985.

He has published over 300 peer-reviewed articles, on the infrared and Raman spectroscopy of synthetic polymers and proteins, and in the field of theoretical and computational studies of the structures of such macromolecules.

In his most recent work, he and colleague/collaborator Noemi Mirkin have proposed a new paradigm in the field of protein folding they term "milieu folding" demonstrating that the presence of particular molecules in the surrounding aqueous environment of a protein molecule ("milieu") can alter the propensities for the folded structure of the protein. They suggest that this is a more appropriate framework than "misfolding" to explore and understand protein-folding diseases.
