= Mildred Widgoff =

American physicist

- Born: August 24, 1924; Buffalo, New York
- Died: July 21, 2004 (aged 79); Barrington, Rhode Island
- Education: University of Buffalo; Cornell University
- Scientific career
- Fields: Particle and Astroparticle physics
- Workplaces: SAM Laboratories; Brookhaven National Laboratory; Harvard Cyclotron Laboratory; Brown University
- Thesis: Neutrons from Interactions of Mu Mesons in Various Targets (1952)

Mildred Widgoff (August 24, 1924 – July 21, 2004) was an American experimental particle physicist and astroparticle physicist who became the first female faculty member at the Brown University physics department.

== Life ==
Mildred Widgoff was born in Buffalo, New York, on August 24, 1924, graduated from the University at Buffalo in 1944 with a bachelor's degree in physics, and came to work for the Manhattan Project in the SAM Laboratories at Columbia University. She earned a Ph.D. in 1952 studying cosmic rays at Cornell University with Giuseppe Cocconi and Kenneth Greisen; her dissertation was Neutrons from Interactions of Mu Mesons in Various Targets.

After completing her doctorate, she became a researcher at the Brookhaven National Laboratory and, in 1955, at the Harvard Cyclotron Laboratory, where she continued to work until 1961. In 1958, she became a research faculty member at Brown University, and in 1961 she became a full-time faculty member at Brown. She was promoted to full professor in 1974, and retired in 1995.

At Brown, Widgoff was executive director of the physics department from 1968 until 1980. She served as chair of the American Physical Society (APS) committee on the status of women in physics and of the APS New England Section in the 1970s.

She died on July 21, 2004, in Barrington, Rhode Island.

== Research ==
Widgoff's doctoral research involved observations of cosmic rays both at high altitude on Mount Blue Sky in Colorado and deep underground at Cornell University. Her early research at Brown centered on the "tau-theta puzzle", in which two different decay paths were thought to originate with different strange particles that could not be distinguished from each other experimentally. This was eventually resolved through the discovery of parity violation and the realization that both paths had the same starting particle, the kaon. Widgoff's work on this problem combined experiments on the Cosmotron at Brookhaven and the Bevatron at Lawrence Berkeley National Laboratory.

In subsequent years she became part of the Cambridge Bubble Chamber Group associated with the Cambridge Electron Accelerator at the Massachusetts Institute of Technology and Harvard University, the International Hybrid Spectrometer Collaboration at Fermilab, and spectroscopy experiments at the Stanford Linear Accelerator Center. Her final experimental work involved the detection of cosmic neutrinos at the Laboratori Nazionali del Gran Sasso in Europe.

== Recognition ==
Widgoff became a Fellow of the American Physical Society in 1968.
