= Marguerite Moilliet Rogers =

American physicist

- Born: Marguerite Moilliet; November 6, 1915; Minatitlán, Veracruz, Mexico
- Died: March 14, 1989 (aged 73); Ridgecrest, California
- Other name: First Lady of China Lake
- Education: Rice University BA, MA, PhD (all physics)
- Known for: Air launched conventional weapons
- Spouse(s): Fred Terry Rogers, Jr.
- Children: 5
- Engineering career
- Institutions: University of Houston, University of North Carolina at Chapel Hill, Royal Technical College
- Employer(s): Naval Ordnance Test Station, Naval Avionics Facility, Oak Ridge National Laboratory, Computer Sciences Corporation
- Projects: Free-fall weapons
- Awards: Achievement Award Society of Women Engineers, L.T.E. Thompson Award, Naval Ordnance Test Station

Marguerite (Peggy) Moilliet Rogers (November 6, 1915 – March 14, 1989) was an American physicist who became the "country's leading authority in the field of air-launched conventional weapons". She conducted ordnance research during World War II for the Navy and spent the majority of her career at the Naval Ordnance Test Station (today the Naval Air Warfare Center) at China Lake, California working in electronics and analysis. Nicknamed the “First Lady of China Lake”, Rogers significantly contributed to free-fall weapons. Her many awards included Fellow of the American Physical Society, the Society of Women Engineers’ Achievement Award, the Department of Defense Distinguished Civilian Service Award, and the L.T.E. Thompson Award from the Naval Weapons Center. Rogers left a legacy as a role model and trailblazer. In 2023, the Dr. Marguerite “Peggy” Rogers Laboratory was commissioned at the Naval Air Warfare Center Weapons Division at China Lake, California.

== Early life and education ==
Marguerite Moilliet was born on November 6, 1915, in Minatitlán, Veracruz, Mexico where her British father was a physician specializing in tropical medicine for an oil company. When she was five years old, her father died, and her family relocated to Seymour, Texas, to be near relatives. Her mother became a schoolteacher and Peggy and her brother went to school there. She was the valedictorian of her high school class and earned the highest scholastic record ever made at the school. She showed interest in science early and was encouraged by both her mother and a high school teacher to pursue a scientific education.

She attended Rice Institute (today Rice University) because at the time it was free to Texas residents. She had a scholarship for books and supplies which was supplemented with funds from her uncle. When she married in 1937 still an undergraduate, the physics department revoked her scholarship. The physics department chair then hired her in various jobs to compensate.

She earned all three of her degrees from Rice – BA with honors (Phi Beta Kappa), MA in physics (1938), and PhD in physics in 1940. She performed research in nuclear physics for her PhD, studying the properties of polonium.

== Career ==
After receiving her PhD, Rogers taught for two years at the University of Houston, advancing to the rank of assistant professor. She was then employed at the Naval Avionics Facility in Indianapolis from 1943-1946. As Head of the Optics Section of the Research Department, Rogers contributed to basic and applied research relating to gun sights, rocket sights, and torpedo directors. For this work, she received a citation from the Navy for meritorious service to naval ordnance development during the war. Her supervisor in Indianapolis was L.T.E. Thompson who would later recruit Rogers to work for the Navy in California.

Upon leaving Indianapolis, Rogers was a Research Associate at the University of North Carolina at Chapel Hill. Here she researched and wrote papers on steel and the behavior of servo-operated rocket potentiometers as well as other topics. She worked briefly at Oak Ridge National Laboratory before moving to China Lake, California to work at the Naval Ordnance Test Station.

From 1949-1953, Rogers conducted analytical studies related to ballistic equations and fire-control errors on rockets and machine guns at China Lake. She relocated to South Carolina where she took a position as Professor of Physics and Head of the Sciences Division at Columbia College in Columbia, South Carolina. She researched terminal ballistics of textile armor assemblies and penetration of bullets into targets.

In 1956, Rogers took a sabbatical and accepted a position at the Royal Technical College in Salford, England as a lecturer in physics. After a year, she returned to the U.S. and employment at China Lake.

Rogers’ career blossomed upon her return to China Lake in 1957. She even earned the nickname “First Lady of China Lake.” As an electronics specialist, she investigated new navigational and fire-control systems. Starting in 1958, she headed the Heavy Attack Systems Analysis Branch in the Aviation Ordnance Department. She received several performance awards while she was in this position. By 1961, she directed analysis work in avionics, space vehicles, free-fall ordnance and weapons, and target recognition. In 1962, Rogers became head of the Air-to-Surface Weapons Division and oversaw approximately 15 major weapons and warheads. She became the foremost expert on air-delivered tactical weapons in the entire Department of Defense. In 1966, she became Head of the Weapons Systems Analysis Division. She said, “those young folks on the ships and airplanes are our children, and we owe it to them to provide the best equipment we can”.

After her retirement from China Lake in 1980, she became the Department Head for Computer Sciences Corporation.

== Awards, honors and professional affiliations ==
Rogers became a Fellow of the American Physical Society in 1962 and was also a Fellow of the Texas Academy of Science (1946).

In 1956 Rogers received the L.T.E. Thompson Award from the Naval Weapons Center for “her outstanding technical leadership and effectiveness in managing and directing the development of a large portion of this country’s conventional warfare arsenal, the Free-Fall Weapons Systems Program.

In 1967 Rogers received the Achievement Award from the Society of Women Engineers “for her outstanding contributions to the field of air-delivered tactical weapons”.

In 1967 Rogers received the American Ordnance Association Harvey C. Knowles Award which is presented annually to an American citizen for a major technical contribution to armament progress. Her citation read “A distinguished authority in the analytical planning and designing of air delivered weapons. Rogers has demonstrated the highest ideals of patriotic citizenship, scientific proficiency, and technical competence”.

In 1975, she received the Federal Woman's Award (the first Navy nominee to receive the award).

In 1980 she received the Navy Distinguished Civilian Service Award, the Navy’s highest civilian award.

In 1981 she received the Department of Defense Distinguished Civilian Service Award, only six of which are awarded each year.

== Legacy ==
Rogers was the first woman to graduate from Rice University with a PhD in physics, 1940.

She was the first woman department head at the Naval Ordnance Test Station and the first woman to hold a public law position.

In 2023, the Dr. Marguerite “Peggy” Rogers Laboratory was established at the Naval Air Warfare Center Weapons Division in China Lake, California dedicated in her memory. It is a major research, development, test, and evaluation facility.

== Personal life ==
Marguerite "Peggy" Moilliet (Rogers) married Fred Terry Rogers, Jr. in 1937. They had five children. Her husband died suddenly of a heart attack in 1956. Upon her husband’s death, Rogers moved herself, her five children, and her mother to England to be closer to her brother. After a year, the family returned to the U.S.

== Additional reading ==
Tietjen, Jill S. (2025). Chapter 21 "Marguerite Rogers". In Craig, Cecilia; Teig, Holly; Kimberling, Debra; Williams, Janet; Tietjen, Jill; Johnson, Vicki (eds.). Women Engineering Legends 1952-1976: Society of Women Engineers Achievement Award Recipients. Springer Cham. ISBN 978-3-032-00223-5
