= Nora Mohler =

American physicist

- Nora Mohler, from a 1951 newspaper photograph.
- Born: 1898; Carlisle, Pennsylvania
- Died: November 29, 1984 (aged 85–86)
- Occupation: Physicist

Nora May Mohler (1898 – November 29, 1984) was an American physicist, elected a Fellow of the American Physical Society in 1941.

== Biography ==
Born in Carlisle, Pennsylvania, she was the daughter of John Frederick Mohler, a mathematician and physicist at Dickinson College and his wife Sarah Loomis Mohler. Mohler attended Conway Hall Preparatory School in Carlisle, graduating as class valedictorian; she was the last girl to attend the school, which subsequently became an all-boys institution. She went on to earn a bachelor's degree in 1917 from Dickinson College, and then undertook graduate studies at Bryn Mawr, where she was inducted into Phi Beta Kappa.

After studying at Bryn Mawr and Radcliffe College, Mohler held teaching positions. She joined the faculty of Smith College as an instructor in 1927, then began research work under the supervision of Gladys Anslow, earning a PhD in 1934. This was the first PhD in physics that Smith had ever awarded. She attained the status of associate professor of physics by 1937; that year and the following, she conducted research at the Cavendish Laboratory. From 1943 to 1946, she took a leave from Smith to do wartime research at the MIT Radiation Laboratory and for the National Defense Research Committee. She became chair of Smith's physics department in 1946. In 1950, Dickinson awarded her an Honorary Doctorate of Science.

In 1951, Mohler was elected Vice-Chair of the American Physical Society's New England section. From 1953 through 1957, she served on the advisory board of the American Journal of Physics.

== Selected publications ==
- Mohler, Nora M. (1931-04-24). "A fused quartz Féry prism". Science. 73 (1895): 452–453. Bibcode:1931Sci....73..452M. doi:10.1126/science.73.1895.452-a. PMID 17810894. S2CID 35939998.
- Nicolson, Marjorie; Mohler, Nora M. (1937). "The scientific background of Swift's Voyage to Laputa". Annals of Science. 2 (3): 299–334. doi:10.1080/00033793700200611. (Described in Nature as "a very interesting study of Swift's Voyage to Laputa, in which they show how carefully Swift read the contemporary scientific literature and how skilfully he was able to make use of it in his own writings".)
- Mohler, Nora M.; Loofbourow, John R. (1952). "Optical filters". American Journal of Physics. 20 (8): 499. Bibcode:1952AmJPh..20..499M. doi:10.1119/1.1933302.
