= Lists of fellows of the American Physical Society =

The American Physical Society honors members with the designation Fellow for having made significant accomplishments to the field of physics.

The following lists are divided chronologically by the year of designation.

- List of fellows of the American Physical Society (1921–1971)
- List of fellows of the American Physical Society (1972–1997)
- List of fellows of the American Physical Society (1998–2010)
- List of fellows of the American Physical Society (2011–present)
