= George Paulikas =

American physicist and space scientist (born 1936)

George A. Paulikas
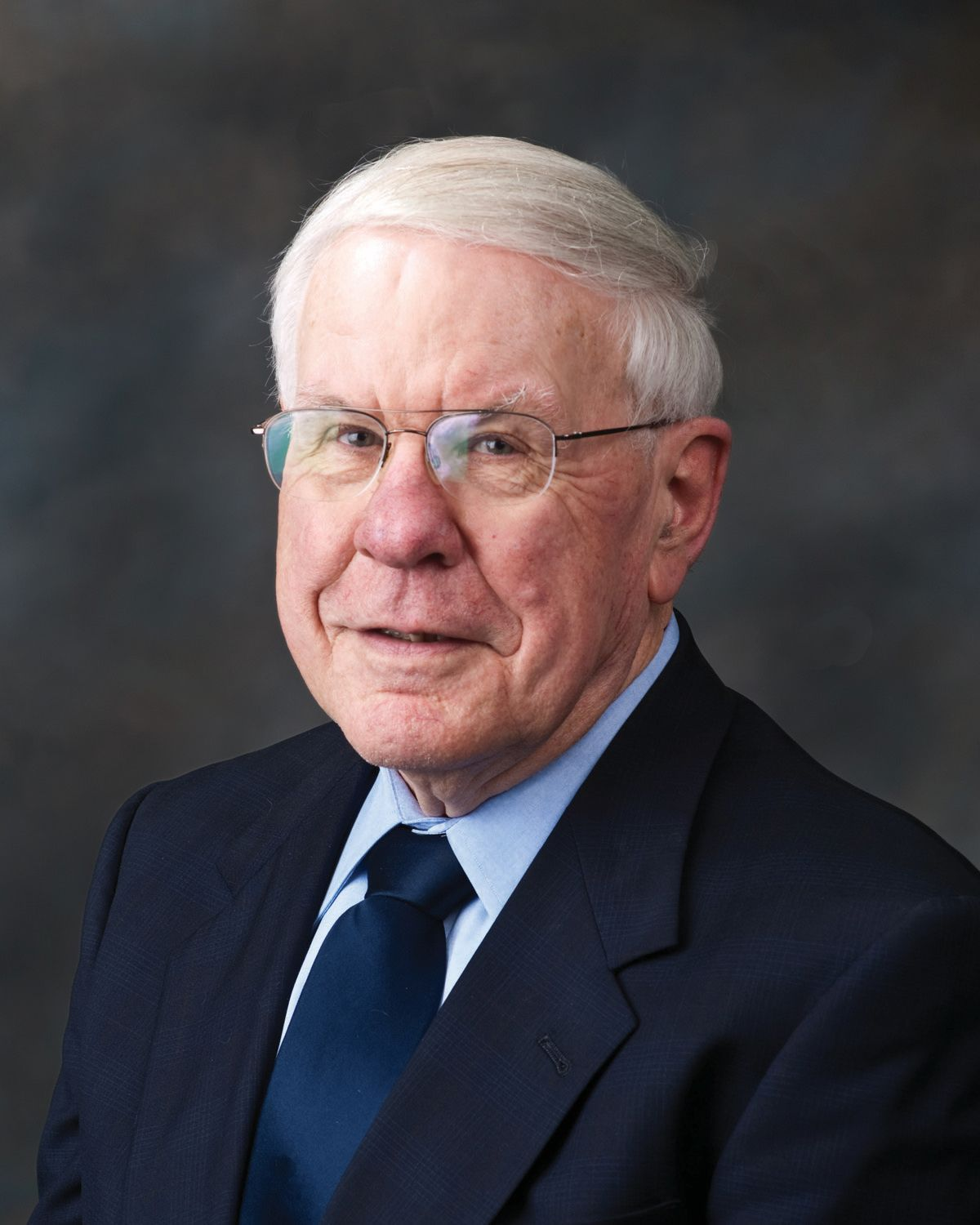
- Born: May 14, 1936 (age 90); Pagėgiai, Lithuania
- Citizenship: American
- Education: University of Illinois (BS, MS); University of California, Berkeley (PhD)
- Known for: Research on Earth's magnetosphere and space radiation environment; leadership in U.S. national security space programs
- Spouse: Joan Paulikas (1936–2023)
- Children: Nancy Paulikas (1960–2016)
- Awards: Trustees’ Distinguished Achievement Award (The Aerospace Corporation); National Reconnaissance Office Gold Medal for Technical Excellence and Leadership; U.S. Air Force Meritorious Civilian Service Award
- Scientific career
- Fields: Space physics Plasma physics Space systems science
- Workplaces: The Aerospace Corporation
- Doctoral advisor: Wulf Bernard Kunkel

George Algis Paulikas (born May 14, 1936) is an American physicist, space scientist, and science administrator best known for his pioneering contributions to the study of Earth's magnetosphere and energetic particles in near-Earth space, as well as for senior leadership roles at The Aerospace Corporation and extensive post-retirement service to the National Academies of Sciences, Engineering, and Medicine. He worked at The Aerospace Corporation for 37 years, rising from technical staff scientist to executive vice president and contributing to U.S. national security and civil space programs.

Paulikas has been recognized as a Fellow of the American Institute of Aeronautics and Astronautics (AIAA) and the American Physical Society (APS) and is a recipient of the National Reconnaissance Office (NRO) Gold Medal for Technical Excellence and Leadership.

== Early life and education ==
Paulikas was born in Pagėgiai, Lithuania, in 1936 and immigrated to the United States with his family in 1949, settling in Chicago. He earned a Bachelor of Science in Engineering Physics (1957) and a Master of Science in physics (1958) from the University of Illinois, followed by a Ph.D. in physics (1961) from the University of California, Berkeley.

At Berkeley, his doctoral research was conducted in laboratory plasma physics under the supervision of Wulf Bernard Kunkel, a physicist noted for contributions to plasma diagnostics and fusion research.

== Career ==
Paulikas joined The Aerospace Corporation in 1961, the year he completed his doctorate, beginning as a member of the technical staff. He spent 37 years with the organization, holding roles including department head, laboratory director, vice president, senior vice president, and executive vice president.

=== Scientific contributions ===
During the early phase of his career, Paulikas was a contributor to the measurement and interpretation of energetic charged particles in Earth's magnetosphere. His work significantly advanced understanding of space radiation dynamics and their effects on spacecraft systems. A seminal 1979 paper co-authored with J. B. Blake became a foundational reference in magnetospheric physics and was later revisited by scientists involved in NASA’s Van Allen Probes mission (2012–2019).

As a principal investigator and later director of the Space Sciences Laboratory, Paulikas led multiple satellite instrumentation experiments sponsored by the U.S. Air Force, supporting both space science research and the design of spacecraft able to operate in high-radiation environments.

From the late 1960s, Paulikas focused primarily on science and engineering management. In senior administrative roles, he oversaw changes to corporate research funding, directed studies on advanced space systems, and supervised the development and operation of specialized space systems for U.S. national security. He retired in 1998.

== Service to the National Academies ==
After retiring, Paulikas became involved in advisory and governance work with the National Academies of Sciences, Engineering, and Medicine. He served as vice chair of the National Research Council’s Space Studies Board from 2003 to 2006 and participated in multiple study committees on U.S. space policy, exploration strategy, and science program priorities.

He also chaired the committee that produced The Scientific Context for Exploration of the Moon (2007), which outlined scientific objectives for lunar exploration and informed planning at NASA.

His committee work additionally included assessments of NASA’s science programs, systems integration for the Constellation program, Earth science strategy, and the future of the U.S. civil space program.

== Honors and recognition ==
- Trustees’ Distinguished Achievement Award, The Aerospace Corporation (1981), the organization's highest internal honor, awarded for research on space radiation effects
- U.S. Air Force Meritorious Civilian Service Award (1981)
- U.S. Air Force Space Division Excellence Award (1984)
- National Reconnaissance Office Gold Medal for Technical Excellence and Leadership
- Fellow, American Institute of Aeronautics and Astronautics
- Fellow, American Physical Society

He is also honored on the Smithsonian National Air and Space Museum Wall of Honor as an Air and Space Leader.

A formal tribute to Paulikas was entered into the U.S. Congressional Record on July 20, 1999, by Representative Steven T. Kuykendall (CA) honoring his 50 years in the United States, his professional achievements, and his family's immigration story.

Paulikas authored the memoir Thirteen Years, 1936–1949, which documents his early life in Lithuania and his family's immigration to the United States following World War II.
