= Robert Stump (physicist) =

American physicist

- Born: 1921; Indianapolis, Indiana, U.S.
- Died: December 23, 2007 (aged 86); Lexington, Kentucky, U.S.
- Education: Butler University; University of Illinois Urbana-Champaign
- Occupation: Physicist
- Spouse: Jeanne Gass

Robert Stump (1921 – December 23, 2007) was an American physicist.

== Early life and career ==
Stump was born in Indianapolis, Indiana, the son of Albert Stump and Susan Thro. He attended Butler University and the University of Illinois Urbana-Champaign, earning his PhD degree in physics.

Stump served as a professor in the department of physics at the University of Kansas from 1950 to 1988. During his years as a professor, in 1962, he was a visiting scientist at Brookhaven National Laboratory in Upton, New York, and in 1965, he was named a fellow of the American Physical Society.

== Personal life and death ==
Stump was married to Jeanne Gass. Their marriage lasted until Stump's death in 2007.

Stump died at the St. Joseph Hospital in Lexington, Kentucky on December 23, 2007, at the age of 86.
