= Kyotoku Fuji =

Japanese physicist

Kyôtoku Fuji
- 藤 教篤
- Died: March 1923
- Education: College of Science, Tokyo Imperial University
- Scientific career
- Fields: Physics
- Workplaces: Tokyo Imperial University

Kyôtoku Fuji (Japanese: 藤 教篤, ? – 1923) was a Japanese physicist at Imperial University, Tokyo, known for research with Shoji Nishikawa on high-voltage electrical equipment and constant high potentials.

== Biography ==
Kyôtoku Fuji was born in Osaka Prefecture. He became a lecturer at Tokyo Imperial University's College of Science in 1908.

Fuji published primarily on experimental physics instrumentation and mathematical physics, and was known for his high-voltage electrical equipment, radioactivity in petroleum, and early X-ray instrumentation. His most widely referenced paper covers the design of high-voltage electrical equipment for early atomic and X-ray physics research.

Kyôtoku Fuji also documented clairvoyance experiments known as "The Seringan Affair" (Senrigan Jikken). Fuji participated in experiments in Marugame, and was quoted as a skeptic: "Even before I went to Marugame to conduct the experiment, I had doubts about Mrs. Ikuko's so-called thoughtography... In short, from what I have investigated, there are many questionable points about Mrs. Ikuko's thoughtography, and there is plenty of reason to suspect that she is using magic tricks."

Kyôtoku Fuji was named a 1921 fellow of the American Physical Society.

Fuji was promoted to professor in March 1923, shortly before his death later that month.

== Publications ==
- Kyôtoku Fuji (1914). "Researches on the Electric Discharge of the Isolated Electric Organ of Astrape (Japanese Electric Ray) by Means of an Oscillograph". Tokyo Sugaku-Buturigakkwai Kizi Dai 2 Ki. 7 (20): 369–397_3. doi:10.11429/ptmps1907.7.20_369.
- Kyôtoku Fuji (1915). "Radium Emanation in Petroleum from Nisiyama Oil Field in the Province of Etigo". Proceedings of the Tokyo Mathematico-Physical Society. 2nd Series. 8 (1): 13–14. doi:10.11429/ptmps1907.8.1_13.
- Kyôtoku Fuji; Shoji Nishikawa (1916). "Outfits for Constant High Potentials to be installed in The Physical Institute, University of Tôkyô". Tokyo Sugaku-Buturigakkwai Kizi Dai 2 Ki. 8 (17): 509–512. doi:10.11429/ptmps1907.8.17_509.
