= Sydney Meshkov =

American physicist (1927–2020)

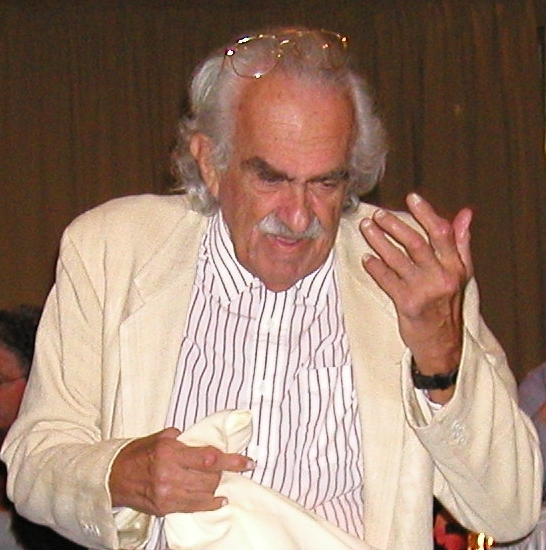
- Meshkov in 2004
- Born: 5 June 1927; Philadelphia, Pennsylvania
- Died: August 31, 2020 (aged 93); Pasadena, California
- Education: University of Pennsylvania
- Scientific career
- Fields: Physics
- Workplaces: NIST, Caltech, LIGO

Sydney Meshkov (5 June 1927 – 31 August 2020) was a Theoretical Physicist who worked in gravitational wave, atomic, nuclear and particle physics.

== Academic career ==
Meshkov received his undergraduate A.B. degree in physics (1947) and his Ph.D. in physics (1954) from the University of Pennsylvania, as well as his M.S. (1949) from the University of Illinois. He held positions at many institutions, most notably at the National Bureau of Standards (NBS, renamed in 1990 as NIST, the National Institute of Standards and Technology) as a member of the Senior Executive Service (1962–1990), and at Caltech, where he was a Visiting Associate and a Visiting Professor of Theoretical Physics in the 1970s and 1980s. He was a LIGO staff member from 1994 to 2020. Before joining LIGO, Meshkov left NIST to spend four years at the Superconducting Super Collider (1990–1994).

He also held positions at Princeton University, the Weizmann Institute, the University of Texas at Arlington, the University of Pittsburgh, the Center for Theoretical Studies, University of Miami, UCLA, UC Santa Barbara, UC Irvine, the University of Pennsylvania, and the University of Delaware.

Meshkov was one of the original organizers for a series of conferences on physics (the "Coral Gables conferences"), taking place at or near the University of Miami, which began in 1964 and continue to the present.

He also played an important role in the development of the Aspen Center for Physics (1968–2020) as Secretary and Trustee, and finally as an Honorary Trustee. When he started working at LIGO, he and Gary Sanders started the first winter conference on gravitational wave detection at Aspen. He continued as a chair of the Gravitational Wave Advanced Detector Workshop (GWADW) series of LIGO conferences until his death in 2020.

== Research ==
Meshkov worked and published research in four fields of physics: Atomic, Nuclear, Elementary Particle, and Gravitational Wave Detection. In his Ph.D. Thesis, on the Theory of Complex Spectra, he developed new techniques for calculating N body matrix elements from 2 and 3 body matrix elements. He successfully applied these techniques to nuclear spectroscopy and became proficient in shell model calculations. While on an extended visit at Princeton University in 1960, working together with Carl Levinson and Manoj Banerjee, Meshkov learned about and then used the group SU(3) to do dynamical calculations in Nuclear Spectroscopy. Meshkov continued the work on SU(3), collaborating with Levinson, at the Weizmann Institute in 1961–62.

In the fall of 1961 Yuval Ne'eman returned to Israel, following completion of his Ph.D. with Abdus Salam at Imperial College London, in which he had developed the Eightfold Way (physics) in work similar to research done independently by Murray Gell-Mann. Since SU(3) was an integral part of this work, Levinson and Meshkov, later joined by Harry Lipkin, used their knowledge of SU(3) to explore this new field. Together with Salam, they showed that the Eightfold Way was correct (instead of the older Sakata model), invented the U-spin and V-spin subgroups of SU(3), and showed that the photon was a U-spin scalar. Meshkov also produced a set of useful SU(3) 8x8 Clebsch–Gordan coefficients. In the meantime, Meshkov, Snow, and Yodh demonstrated the validity of SU(3) flavor symmetry in reaction analyses.

Lipkin and Meshkov invented W-spin and SU(6)_{W}, which allowed the combination of external and internal symmetries, for co-linear processes. Peter Kaus and Meshkov collaborated in a series of papers exploring quark structure, and extended this work to neutrinos. Meshkov's subsequent innovations include influential contributions to hadronic physics.

Meshkov started working on LIGO, in 1994; this is the detector that ultimately observed cosmic gravitational waves. At the time, he was chair of the Aspen Center for Physics Winter Conferences. Together with Gary Sanders, he started the first Gravitational Wave Detection Conference in Aspen in 1995. This has evolved into a three-year cycle of GWADW conferences, rotating between the United States, Europe (in particular, the island of Elba), and Japan or Australia. Until 2020, Meshkov was either chair or co-chair of these conferences to explore upgrades and possible new facilities and techniques for gravitational wave detection.

== Recognition, awards, and honors ==
- 2018 and 1999: Amaldi Conference Organizer
- 2017: Princess of Asturias Award In Technical and Scientific Research - co-recipient
- 2017: Einstein Prize co-recipient
- 2016: Gruber Cosmology Prize co-recipient
- 2016: Breakthrough Prize in Fundamental Physics co-recipient
- 2015: Member of the LIGO team whose discovery of gravitational waves led to the 2016 Nobel Prize in Physics
- 1993: Coral Gables Conference Dedication to Sydney Meshkov
- 1965–1971: Principal Investigator of the Office of Naval Research (ONR) at NIST
- 1966: National Bureau of Standards Distinguished Authorship Award
- 1965: Fellow of the American Physical Society
