= Sinclair Smith (astronomer) =

American astronomer

- Born: March 24, 1899; Chicago, Illinois, U.S.
- Died: May 18, 1938 (aged 39); Pasadena, California, U.S.
- Education: Caltech (B.Sc., Ph.D.)
- Known for: Early evidence of dark matter
- Scientific career
- Fields: Astronomy
- Workplaces: Mount Wilson Observatory

Sinclair Smith (24 March 1899 in Chicago – 18 May 1938 in Pasadena) was an American astronomer. His observations of the Virgo Cluster were among the first to suggest the existence of dark matter.

== Biography ==
Born in Chicago, Smith moved with his family to Italy in 1906 for two years. They then relocated to Indiana, where they lived until 1913, before settling in California.

As a child, he showed a great interest in mechanical design and drawing. He was hired as a draughtsman for the design of the Mount Wilson Observatory's 100-inch (2.5-metre) Hooker Telescope.

He earned his bachelor's degree from the California Institute of Technology (Caltech) in 1921, and in 1924, he obtained his Ph.D. for his work with John August Anderson. His doctoral work focused on the exploding wire method, used to obtain laboratory spectra at high excitation and ionization energies.

He then spent a year at the Cavendish Laboratory at Cambridge University, and worked at the physics laboratory of the Mount Wilson Observatory for the rest of his life.

He died of cancer in 1938 at the age of 39.

== Publications ==
- Sinclair Smith (January 15, 1924). "Note on Electrically Exploded Wires in High Vacuum". Proceedings of the National Academy of Sciences of the United States of America. 10 (1): 4–5. Bibcode:1924PNAS...10....4S. doi:10.1073/pnas.10.1.4. ISSN 0027-8424. JSTOR 84200. PMC 1085498. PMID 16576775.
- Sinclair Smith; Richard C. Tolman (May 15, 1926). "On the Nature of Light". Proceedings of the National Academy of Sciences of the United States of America. 12 (5): 343–347. Bibcode:1926PNAS...12..343T. doi:10.1073/pnas.12.5.343. JSTOR 84632. PMC 1084554. PMID 16587092.
- Sinclair Smith; Richard C. Tolman (August 15, 1926). "Remarks on Professor Lewis's Note on the Path of Light Quanta in an Interference Field". Proceedings of the National Academy of Sciences of the United States of America. 12 (8): 508–509. Bibcode:1926PNAS...12..508T. doi:10.1073/pnas.12.8.508. JSTOR 84735. PMC 1084655. PMID 16587118.
- Sinclair Smith (May 15, 1930). "The Effect of Low Temperatures on the Sensitivity of Radiometers". Proceedings of the National Academy of Sciences of the United States of America. 16 (5): 373–376. Bibcode:1930PNAS...16..373S. doi:10.1073/pnas.16.5.373. JSTOR 85567. PMC 526650. PMID 16587584.
- Sinclair Smith (August 1934). "The Spectral Distribution of Stellar Energy Determined with the Radiometer". Publications of the Astronomical Society of the Pacific. 46 (272): 215–216. Bibcode:1934PASP...46..215S. doi:10.1086/124465. ISSN 0004-6280. JSTOR 40669205. S2CID 123240759.

== Appendices ==
=== Bibliography ===
==== Biography ====
- [Necrology] John August Anderson (August 1938). "Sinclair Smith". Publications of the Astronomical Society of the Pacific. 50 (296). Astronomical Society of the Pacific: 232–233. Bibcode:1938PASP...50..232A. doi:10.1086/124947. eISSN 1538-3873. ISSN 0004-6280. S2CID 250792095..
- Virginia Trimble (1990). "Smith Sinclair (1899-1938)". In Bertotti B, Balbinot R, Bergia S (eds.). Modern Cosmology in Retrospect. Cambridge University Press. pp. 411–413. ISBN 9780521372138..
- Virginia Trimble (2007). "Smith, Sinclair". In Thomas Hockey; et al. (eds.). Biographical Encyclopedia of Astronomers. Springer Science+Business Media. pp. 1067–1068. doi:10.1007/978-0-387-30400-7_1292. ISBN 9780387304007..

==== Other works ====
- Brian Greene (2007). "A Prediction of Darkness". The Fabric of the Cosmos: Space, Time, and the Texture of Reality. Doubleday. pp. 294–295. ISBN 9780307428530..
