= S. Peter Rosen =

Simon Peter Rosen
- Born: August 4, 1933
- Died: October 13, 2006 (aged 73); Rockville, Maryland
- Education: Oxford University
- Known for: Double Beta Decay, Neutrino Oscillation
- Spouse: Adrienne Rosen (married 1987-2006)
- Children: 4
- Scientific career
- Fields: Physics

Simon Peter Rosen (August 4, 1933 – October 13, 2006) was an American theoretical particle physicist, known for his work on beta decay and neutrino oscillation.

== Career ==
Rosen was born in London, England in 1933 and was educated at Leeds Central High School and Roundhay School before matriculating at Merton College, Oxford in 1951, where he read mathematics.

Rosen became a U.S. citizen in 1972. He received his doctorate in physics from Oxford University in 1957. He was a professor of physics at Purdue University from 1962-1984. He was the assistant division head of nuclear and particle physics at the Los Alamos National Laboratory from 1983-1990. He was a professor of physics at the University of Texas at Arlington from 1990-1996 serving as the dean of science. Dr. Rosen finished his career as associate director of the Office of High Energy and Nuclear Physics from 1997 to 2003.
