= Harvard Cyclotron Laboratory =

Proton accelerator used for research and development

Coordinates: 42.380°N 71.116°W

The control panel of the Harvard Cyclotron Laboratory circa 1950

The Harvard Cyclotron Laboratory operated from 1949 to 2002. It was most notable for its contributions to the development of proton therapy.

The Harvard Cyclotron Laboratory was built with office of Naval Research funds between 1946 and 1949 to replace an earlier, lower energy, cyclotron that was sent to Los Alamos for use in the Manhattan Project. Until 1961, the laboratory primarily performed experiments in physics. The lab performed research and development in particle physics (including particle detectors development and testing), activation analysis, radiobiology, and solid state physics.

The control panel of the Harvard Cyclotron Laboratory in 1989

The use of proton particle accelerators for external beam radiotherapy was largely developed at this facility in collaboration with Massachusetts General Hospital. From 1961 to its closing, the laboratory provided proton therapy to over 9,000 patients. After 1974, "almost 3,000" patients were treated for ocular (eye) diseases. By the time the lab closed in 2002, its proton therapy treatments had been transferred to The Francis H. Burr Proton Therapy Center (then the Northeast Proton Therapy Center) at Massachusetts General Hospital.

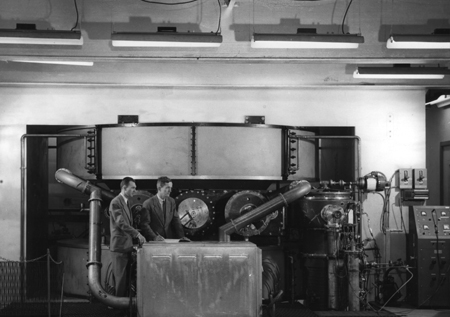
The cyclotron during construction in 1948. Shown are Dr. Lee Davenport (L) and Dr. Norman Ramsay (R).

== See also ==
- List of accelerators in particle physics
