= George Wilber Moffitt =

American physicist and optical instrument designer

- Born: 28 March 1887; Pleasantville, Iowa
- Died: 24 September 1965; Ridgewood, New Jersey
- Education: 1910, B.A., Iowa State University; 1913, Ph.D., Stanford University
- Awards: 1908 Lowden prize in mathematics, University of Iowa; 1921 Fellow, American Physical Society
- Scientific career
- Fields: Optics
- Workplaces: Washington University (St.Louis); Kodak Lab, (Rochester, NY); Optical laboratory, Frankfort Arsenal (Philadelphia); Yerkes Observatory of the University of Chicago; New York optical firm: Perkins, Elmer, and Moffitt; Independent consultant

George Wilber Moffitt (1887–1965) was an optical physicist and astronomer, a designer of lenses, lens systems, and optical instruments. As a staff member of the Yerkes Observatory, he worked on stellar parallax and was a leader in optical design. Moffitt also assisted the development of spectrographs for reflectors of the Perkins Observatory and McDonald Observatory.

== Early life and education ==
The son of Joab Moffitt and Stella (née Rouze) Moffitt, George Wilbur Moffitt was born in Iowa in 1887.

In 1910, at Iowa State University, Moffitt completed his Bachelor of Arts degree, having majored in mathematics and minored in physics. He took his graduate studies at Stanford University, and was awarded a Ph.D. in physics there in 1913. His dissertation, A study of some changes in the air-liquid contact potential difference, was advised by Fernando Sanford.

In 1916, Moffitt married Jane Ranken Lytle. They had two sons, Ranken Moffitt and George Wilbur Moffitt, Jr., and then divorced in 1926. Moffitt later married Ada E. Rogers in October 1932.

== Career ==
In 1910, Moffitt was named assistant to the chair of physics of Stanford University. From 1913 to 1917 Moffitt taught undergraduates in the physics department at Washington University in St. Louis. For the next four years Moffitt served as a research physicist at the Kodak Laboratory in Rochester, working on photographic lenses, military projects, and a home projection lens. From 1922 to 1926 Moffitt was civilian head of the optical laboratory of the Frankfort Arsenal in Philadelphia, concentrating on design and criticism of optical instruments to control weapons fire.

Moffitt then joined the Yerkes Observatory of the University of Chicago at Williams Bay, Wisconsin, where he worked for 11 years as an expert on stellar parallax and optical lens design. Moffitt contributed to the development of the spectrographs for the Perkins Observatory's 69-inch reflector and the McDonald Observatory's 82 inch reflector. Moffitt had completed these assignments in 1937, but Yerkes' new director, Otto Struve, "decided to let his designer go, after terminating the parallax program, viewing Moffitt's contributions as undistinguished."

Moffitt unsuccessfully protested, but eventually left the field, and joined an "optical design and consulting firm." By 1940, that partnership dissolved, and Moffitt became "an independent consultant in the optical business, operating out of his home in Ridgewood, New Jersey." He succeeded gaining optical and camera manufacturing design contracts and wartime projects. In the 1950's, his consultation work led to a brief vice-presidency at Smith-Dietrich Corporation, the company where he helped develop the "Cinemiracle" lens system.

George Wilber Moffit died in 1965 in Ridgewood, New Jersey.

== Selected publications ==
- Moffitt, G. W. (1917-03-01). "A New Direct Reading Precision Refractometer with Uniformly Divided Scale". Journal of Industrial & Engineering Chemistry. 9 (3): 305–309. doi:10.1021/ie50087a027. ISSN 0095-9014.
- Moffitt, G. W. (1932a). "Thirty-one determinations of stellar parallax". Astronomical Journal. 41: 167–168.
- Moffitt, G. W. (1932b). "Nineteen determinations of stellar parallax". Astronomical Journal. 42: 9–10.
- Moffitt, G. W. (1932-09-01). "Frequency Requirements and the Control of Frequency for Synchronous Motor Operation of Astronomical Telescopes". Review of Scientific Instruments. 3 (9): 499–510. doi:10.1063/1.1748969. ISSN 0034-6748.
- Moffitt, G. W. (1935-03-01). "The Influence of Present Trends in Research on the Design of Astronomical Telescopes and Accessories". JOSA. 25 (3). Optica Publishing Group: 71–79. doi:10.1364/JOSA.25.000071.
- Moffitt, G. W. (1935-05-01). "The New Yerkes Auto-Collimating Spectrograph as Used on the Perkins 69-Inch Reflecting Telescope". JOSA. 25 (5). Optica Publishing Group: 142–151. doi:10.1364/JOSA.25.000142.
- Moffitt, G. W. (1938). "Thirty-two determinations of stellar parallax". Astronomical Journal. 47: 39–40.
- Moffitt, G. W. (1947-07-01). "Compensation of Flexure in Range Finders and Sighting Instruments". Journal of the Optical Society of America. 37 (7): 582. doi:10.1364/JOSA.37.000582. ISSN 0030-3941.

== Awards, honors ==
- 1908 – Lowden prize in mathematics
- 1910 – Honorary scientific fraternity, Sigma Xi.
- 1921 – APS General Fellowship.
