= Carleton C. Murdock =

American physicist

Carleton Chase Murdock (July 29, 1884 – June 5, 1971) was an American physicist, teaching and researching primarily at Cornell University. He served as Dean of University Faculty from 1945 to 1951. Within the field of physics, he was known for research in the field of crystal structures and X-ray diffractions. During academic year 1926–27, Murdock also conducted research at the Royal Institute’s Davy-Faraday Laboratory in London, England.

== Early education and career ==
Murdock graduated from secondary schooling at Cooperstown High School in 1902. Proceeding to Colgate University, he took his bachelor's degree in 1907. From Colgate he proceeded to the University of Maine at Orono, Maine where he served an assistant instructor in Physics. Murdock was brought to Cornell by Physics Department Chairman and dean of graduate studies, Ernest Merritt, to undertake post-doctoral studies in 1908. Starting as an assistant instructor, he was appointed physics instructor in three weeks time. Murdock completed both his masters’ and doctoral work by 1919, at which time he was made a Cornell assistant professor. He was elevated to full professor in 1932. Professor Murdock is “remembered as the personification of the legendary professor, a man whose very presence created an atmosphere of dignity and humanity, of intellect and service.”

== Pedagogy and research ==
Professor Murdock systematically graded each examination for a student’s successes, marking each paper three separate times, from three different viewpoints. This allowed both Murdock and the Cornell student to understand exactly what the student had mastered and where the student’s failings lay. To formal physics course work, Professor Murdock also added lessons in intellectual integrity and human courtesy.

From the 1928 to 1935, Professor Murdock also led an innovative advanced laboratory for Cornell seniors and graduate students. The subject material included research experiments in areas of emerging or unsettled importance within the field of physics. Each student designed his own experiment (usually to highlight some important physical principle), chose the equipment needed, and fabricated some of the necessary components. In the field of teaching physics, this practical approach became known as “Murdock’s Lab.” In this pedagogical setting, Professor Murdock encouraged high performance and instilled enthusiasm for understanding physics. The Lab he created continued in this manner through the academic year 1955-56, twenty years after he had moved to other assignments at Cornell.

As a researcher, Murdock undertook early studies of photoelectric reactions and soon focused on new developments in X-ray physics and, in particular, by the use of X-rays in deducing the structure of crystals. His enthusiasm focused on the complicated task of computing, from subtle aberrations in X-ray diffraction patterns, the extent of imperfections in crystals and the size and shape of crystals far too small to be seen under the microscope of his day. This is what eventually led him to pioneer the application of computers to Cornell research by working with Caltech’s Linus Pauling. Such studies comprised the bulk of his extensive research career in the last two decades before retirement. He also directed his students toward applied sciences. The doctoral thesis of an early graduate student, published in the first issue of the Journal of Applied Physics, is now a classical work in the literature of the field of soil physics.

== Dean of University Faculty, Cornell University ==
The Cornell Faculty memorialized Murdock as “ the personification of the legendary professor, a man whose very presence created an atmosphere of dignity and humanity. He was first a teacher of physics but no less an inspiring colleague. His own care and rigor induced care and rigor in students and colleagues alike.” Murdock was elected Dean of the University Faculty in 1945. He “brought to the office an unfailing dignity and courtesy, together with strength and wisdom, during a time of difficulty for the University. Following the end of World War II, a surge in enrollments occurred, but so did inflation that eroded the value of Faculty salaries and impaired Faculty morale. The emergence of McCarthyism deeply unsettled the campus.” President Edmund Ezra Day’s retirement left Cornell University with an absence of leadership. Dean Murdock “gave stability to a shaken faculty, and his term was extended until a new president had been installed.”

== Family life ==
Murdock was native to Cooperstown, New York. He was the son of Myrtle (Chase) Murdock and Benjamin F. Murdock, a dry goods merchant. Carleton Murdock was married to fellow Cornellian Dorothy Lee Waugh on August 28, 1923. Dorothy Lee Waugh graduated from Northwestern University in 1917 and moved to Ithaca, New York where she took a masters from Cornell in 1923. She taught physics as Vassar College prior to returning to Ithaca. Professor Murdock retired to the position of professor emeritus in 1953. He visited Cooperstown regularly throughout his life, and maintained the family lake cottage on Lake Otsego. He and Mrs. Murdock lived at 319 Wait Avenue in Ithaca, New York. As a young instructor, Murdock lived at 804 E. Seneca Street, before that neighborhood transitioned completely to student rental housing. He is interred at Lakewood Cemetery, Cooperstown. Professor and Mrs. Murdock had two sons, the Reverend Frank W. Murdock of Storrs, Connecticut and Edmund L. Murdock of Reston, Virginia.

== Associations ==
Profess Murdock was a member of the American Association for the Advancement of Science, American Crystallographic Association, American Physical Society (Fellow), American Society of Physics Teachers, American Society for X-Ray and Electron Diffraction, Optical Society of America, Phi Beta Kappa, Phi Kappa Phi, Phi Kappa Psi (serving as faculty advisor to its Cornell Chapter), Sigma Xi (serving on its national executive committee, 1943–48), Gamma Alpha (serving as president), and the New York Academy of Sciences.

== Sample publications ==
- Carleton C. Murdock & Dorothy Waugh Murdock, The effect of series resistance on the current from a photo-active cell containing a fluorescent electrolyte, Transactions of the Faraday Society (1927) at 593-600.
- Carleton C. Murdock, The Location of Electromotive Force in a Photo-Active Cell Containing a Fluorescent Electrolyte, Proceedings of the National Academy Sciences (12:8)(1926) at 504-508.
- Carleton C. Murdock, The Form of the X-Ray Diffraction for Regular Crystals of Colloidal Size, Physical Review (35:1)(Jan. 1930) at 8-23.
- Carleton C. Murdock, The Location of Electromotive Force in a Photo-Active Cell Containing a Fluorescent Electrolyte, Proceedings of the National Academy of Sciences (12:8)(Aug. 1926) at 504-8.
