= Gladys Anslow =

American physicist

- Born: Gladys Amelia Anslow; May 22, 1892; Springfield, Massachusetts, U.S.
- Died: March 31, 1969 (aged 76); Brookline, Massachusetts, U.S.
- Education: Springfield Central High School; Smith College (BA, MA); Yale University (PhD)
- Scientific career
- Fields: Mass spectroscopy
- Workplaces: Smith College

Gladys Amelia Anslow (May 22, 1892 – March 31, 1969) was an American physicist who taught for over forty years at Smith College. She was the first woman to work with the cyclotron at the University of California, Berkeley and served in the Office of Scientific Research and Development during World War II.

== Early life and education ==
Anslow was born in Springfield, Massachusetts to John Anslow and Ella Iola Leonard. Anslow attended Springfield Central High School and entered Smith College in 1909. While studying at Smith College, Anslow was a member of the Mathematical Society and served as vice president of the Physics Club. In her second year, Anslow elected a focus on physics under Frank Allan Waterman. Following her graduation with an A.B. in 1914, Anslow was appointed as a Department of Physics demonstrator (1914–1915) and then an assistant in physics (1915–1917).

In 1916 she began her graduate studies in advanced physics under Smith professor Janet T. Howell, taking Howell's course in spectroscopy. Howell introduced Anslow to the new Rowland grating spectrograph acquired by Smith College to research the emission spectra of radium, resulting in Anslow's thesis "Spectroscopic Evidence for the Electron Theory of Matter". Anslow graduated in 1917 with her A.M. Following her graduation, she was appointed instructor in physics at Smith College to replace Howell.

== Career ==
Anslow obtained a Ph.D. in physics from Yale University in 1924 and upon graduation returned to Smith as an associate professor, attaining the role of full professor in 1930. From 1941 to 1958 Smith served as chairman of graduate studies at Smith.

From July 1944 to December 1945, during World War II, Anslow was named head of the communications and information section of the Office of Field Services in the Office of Scientific Research and Development (OSRD), formerly the National Defense Research Committee (NRDC), which controlled the flow of classified information to the research community. For this work she was awarded the President's Certificate of Merit in 1949. It was unusual at the time for a woman to work at the OSRD, let alone in an influential administrative position. However, Anslow was not unique. Also working for the OSRD/NRDC at the time were Dorothy Walcott Weeks in the liaison office and Margaret Moses and Louise Kelley in the office of the Chairman.

Anslow was a member of the American Physical Society, where she was the president of the New England Section. She also served on the executive board of the American Association of Physics Teachers, as vice president of the Massachusetts division of the American Association of University Women and was the president of the Massachusetts division of Phi Beta Kappa.

Anslow retired from Smith College in 1960 as a Professor Emerita. Anslow died March 31, 1969, in Brookline, Massachusetts at Peter Bent Brigham Hospital. Her papers are in the Smith College Libraries.

== Research ==
The first woman to work with the cyclotron ("atomic whirligig to smash the atom") at the University of California, Berkeley, she collaborated with fellow Smith physicist Dorothy Wrinch on a "spectrochemical study of protein molecules for the eventual production of synthetic foods and drugs" under a grant from the Office of Naval Research, the first research grant of its kind at Smith College.

== Honors ==
For her wartime work she was awarded the President's Certificate of Merit in 1949, one of only three educators so honored. She was elected a Fellow of the American Physical Society in 1936 and a Fellow of the American Academy of Arts and Sciences in 1955.

Sigma Delta Epsilon, a fraternal organization for women in science, named Anslow the year's "Woman in Science" by in 1950. In 1951 Anslow received a research award from the organization for her work on the ultraviolet spectra of protein molecules.

She received an honorary Sc. D. from Smith College and in 1967 was also awarded a Sophia Smith Fellowship from the college.

== Selected Publications ==
- Anslow, Gladys A. (1945). "Ultraviolet Spectra of Biologically Important Molecules". Journal of Applied Physics. 16: 41–49. Bibcode:1945JAP....16...41A. doi:10.1063/1.1707499.
- Anslow, Gladys A.; Hsieh, Hsi-Teh; Shea, Ruth C. (1949-04-01). "Ultraviolet Absorption by Hydrogen-Bridged Molecules". The Journal of Chemical Physics. 17 (4): 426–427. Bibcode:1949JChPh..17..426A. doi:10.1063/1.1747276. ISSN 0021-9606.
- Anslow, Gladys A. (1953-11-01). "The Sites of the Amino-Acid Residues on a Cyclol Model of Insulin". The Journal of Chemical Physics. 21 (11): 2083–2084. Bibcode:1953JChPh..21.2083A. doi:10.1063/1.1698765. ISSN 0021-9606.
