= Shang-Yi Ch'en =

American physicist (1910–1997)

- "George" Shang-Yi Chen, Professor Emeritus of Physics. University of Oregon
- Born: March 4, 1910; Hebei, Qing Empire
- Died: February 23, 1997 (aged 86)
- Other name: "George"
- Citizenship: American
- Occupation: Faculty at University of Oregon
- Awards: APS Fellow, 1963

Academic background
- Education: California Institute of Technology
- Thesis: The broadening of the resonance lines of rubidium under different homogenous pressures of its own vapor. The broadening, asymmetry and drift of rubidium resonance lines under homogenous pressures of helium and argon up to 100 atmospheres (1940)
- Doctoral advisor: Ira S. Bowen

Academic work
- Discipline: Physicist

Shang-Yi Ch'en (4 March 1910 – 23 February 1997) was a Chinese-born American physicist who was professor emeritus of Physics at the University of Oregon. His field was optical spectroscopy, and his research interests included spectral line shifts and collision-induced absorption and emission of atoms. He was elected a Fellow of the American Physical Society in 1963.

== Early life and education ==
Ch'en was born 4 March 1910 in Hebei, China. In Beijing at Yenching University he earned a B.S. degree in 1932 and an M.S. degree in 1934. As a research assistant at the National Academy of the Beijing Institute of Physics, he studied pressure broadening of spectral lines. He received a fellowship from the China Foundation to study at the California Institute of Technology, where in 1940 his Ph.D. dissertation was published, supervised by Ira S. Bowen, titled The broadening of the resonance lines of rubidium under different homogenous pressures of its own vapor. The broadening, asymmetry and drift of rubidium resonance lines under homogenous pressures of helium and argon up to 100 atmospheres.

== Career ==
When Ch'en completed his final exams in 1939, he returned to Yenching University in China to be near his family; he did not attend his Caltech graduation, thus missing recognition due for his cum laude honors. He conducted research at Yenching, establishing a spectroscopy lab there until the beginning of World War II, when he fled to Chengtu in southwestern China.

Following the war, in 1949 Ch'en joined the faculty at the University of Oregon, where he taught and conducted research until his retirement in 1975. According to his colleagues Bernd Craseman and David McDaniels, "Among his most widely known work is a survey of the field... written with Makoto Takeo and published in the Reviews of Modern Physics" in 1957.

He also served as an associate editor of Journal of Quantitative Spectroscopy and Radiative Transfer.

=== Shang-Yi Ch'en Professorship ===
Robert A. Millikan wrote encouraging letters to Ch'en that his son Eugene found after his father's death. According to his son, "When he came to Caltech, it was really, truly a foreign environment for him... There was nobody he knew here. He had very limited resources..." His son has established a trust to support the Shang-Yi Ch'en Professorship at Caltech.

== Selected publications ==
- Ch'en, Shang-yi; Takeo, Makoto (1 January 1957). "Broadening and Shift of Spectral Lines Due to the Presence of Foreign Gases". Reviews of Modern Physics. 29 (1): 20–73. doi:10.1103/RevModPhys.29.20.
- Ch'en, Shang Yi; Garrett, Robert O. (8 April 1966). "Pressure Effects of Foreign Gases on the Absorption Lines of Cesium. I. The Effects of Argon on the First Two Members of the Principal Series". Physical Review. 144 (1): 59–65. doi:10.1103/PhysRev.144.59.
- Garrett, Robert O.; Ch'en, Shang Yi (8 April 1966). "Pressure Effects of Foreign Gases on the Absorption Lines of Cesium. II. The Effects of Helium on the First Two Members of the Principal Series". Physical Review. 144 (1): 66–70. doi:10.1103/PhysRev.144.66.
- Ch'en, Shang Yi; Looi, Eng Choon; Garrett, Robert O. (5 March 1967). "Pressure Effects of Foreign Gases on the Absorption Lines of Cesium. III. The Effects of Krypton". Physical Review. 155 (1): 38–45. doi:10.1103/PhysRev.155.38.

== Awards and honors ==
- 1963, Fellow of the American Physical Society
