= Linear transport theory =

In mathematical physics Linear transport theory is the study of equations describing the migration of particles or energy within a host medium when such migration involves random absorption, emission and scattering events. Subject to certain simplifying assumptions, this is a common and useful framework for describing the scattering of light (radiative transfer) or neutrons (neutron transport).

Given the laws of individual collision events (in the form of absorption coefficients and scattering kernels/phase functions) the problem of linear transport theory is then to determine the result of a large number of random collisions governed by these laws. This involves computing exact or approximate solutions of the transport equation, and there are various forms of the transport equation that have been studied. Common varieties include steady-state vs time-dependent, scalar vs vector (the latter including polarization), and monoenergetic vs multi-energy (multi-group).

== See also ==
- Radiative transfer
- Neutron transport
