= Frank W. Ham =

American physicist and professor

Frank W. Ham (1875–1956) was a professor of physics at Montana State College. He was elected a fellow of the American Physical Society in 1921.

== Early life and education ==
The son of Treeman Independence Ham and Phoebe Elizabeth (Holdridge) Ham, Frank W. Ham was born on September 12, 1875, in Newark, New Jersey. He married Margaret Godfrey in 1905.

Ham earned a B.S. at Montana State College (MSC) in 1903, and an M.S. there in 1905. He also did graduate work at the University of Chicago.

== Career ==
MSC hired Ham in 1905 as an assistant chemist, and as an instructor in 1907. In 1909 he was appointed an assistant professor of physics there, and became professor and department head in 1911.

In 1927, Ham took "a sabbatical leave of absence for graduate study and travel." He fell ill and retired to his ranch near Whitehall. He died of Parkinson's disease in 1956.

== Awards, honors ==
- 1921 Elected a Fellow of the American Physical Society.
