= Willie Hobbs Moore =

American physicist

- Born: Willie Hobbs; May 23, 1934; Atlantic City, New Jersey, US
- Died: March 14, 1994 (aged 59); Ann Arbor, Michigan, US
- Education: University of Michigan (Ph.D., 1972)
- Scientific career
- Fields: Physics, engineering
- Workplaces: Ford Motor Company, Datamax
- Thesis: A Vibrational Analysis of Secondary Chlorides
- Doctoral advisor: Samuel Krimm

Willie Hobbs Moore (May 23, 1934 – March 14, 1994) was an African American physicist and engineer. She is the first African American woman to earn a PhD in physics.

== Early life ==
Willie Hobbs was born in Atlantic City, New Jersey, on May 23, 1934, to parents Bestie and Will Hobbs. Will Hobbs was a plumber and businessman and Bessie Hobbs was a housewife and local hotel employee. She had two sisters, Alice Doolin and Thelma Gordy. In high school, she was a straight A student with an aptitude for math and science.

== Education ==
In 1952, Hobbs moved to Ann Arbor, Michigan where she attended the University of Michigan as a first-generation college student. At the University of Michigan, she became the first Black woman to earn a bachelor of science in electrical engineering in 1958. Similarly, she became the first African-American woman to earn a master of science in electrical engineering in 1961.

In 1972, she earned a doctorate in physics from the University of Michigan, making her the first African American woman to receive a PhD in physics from an American university. Her doctoral thesis, A Vibrational Analysis of Chlorides, was completed under the supervision of spectroscopist Dr. Samuel Krimm. Moores thesis focused on the vibrations of secondary chlorides for polyvinyl-chloride polymers. In her work, Moore calculated the vibrational modes of many nonlinear organic molecules that contain secondary chloride atoms. Her goal was to complete a potential field that could be used in normal coordinate analyses to predict the vibrational modes of all secondary chlorides. Next, Moore used vibrational spectroscopy to determine the structure of PVCs. With her data Moore obtained a force field for secondary chlorides and used it to calculate the vibrational frequencies of crystalline PVC.

After receiving her doctorate, Moore worked at the University of Michigan in the department of physics and the Macromolecular Research Center as a lecturer and research scientist until 1977, continuing spectroscopic work on proteins. In the five years following her dissertation, she published more than thirty papers with Krimm and collaborators, in a variety of journals, including the Journal of Molecular Spectroscopy, The Journal of Chemical Physics, and the Journal of Applied Physics. Additionally, Moore and Yuin Wu published "Quality Engineering" in the American Supplier Institute in 1986.

== Career ==
From 1961 to 1962 Moore worked at a Junior engineer at Bendix Aerospace Systems, where she calculated the radiation from various types of plasmas and also wrote proposals. From 1962-1963 Moore took a job at Barnes Engineering Company where she worked on approximating the IR radiation from wakes of space reentry vehicles. By the end of 1963, Moore was working at Senor Dynamics as a theoretical analyst of stress-optical devices.

Next Moore was a research associate at the Institute of Science and Technology at the University of Michigan where she modeled optical hypersonic wakes and certified existing flow-field models. In 1967, Moore began working at KMS Industries as a system analyst where she supported optics design staff and established computer requirements for optics. Then Moore worked as a senior analyst at Datamax Corp in 1968.

In 1977, Moore was hired by Ford Motor Company as an assembly engineer. Moore expanded Ford's use of Japanese engineering and manufacturing methods in the 1980s. She did this in part by writing a technical paper which communicated the concepts of Japanese engineer Genichi Taguchi as working design methods for practical use. Moore went on to become an executive at Ford; in this position she oversaw the warranty department of the automobile assembly.

In January 1991, Ebony magazine named Moore as one of their 100 "Most Promising Black Women in Corporate America".

== Personal life ==
On August 17, 1963, Willie Hobbs Moore married Sidney Moore and they were married for thirty years. Sidney Moore has a bachelor of science from Jackson State University in Mississippi and master of science in educational psychology from the University of Michigan. Sidney Moore worked at Michigan Neuropsychiatric Institute for 38 years and retired in 1997. They had two children, Dorian Moore, M.D. and Christopher Moore RN. Moore has 3 grandchildren, Sydney Padgett, William Hobbs Moore, and C. Jackson Moore.

According to firsthand interviews with family members, Krimm, former students and mentees Moore was “highly intelligent, witty, empathetic, and kindhearted with a mild New Jersey accent”.

Moore was a tutor at the Saturday African-American Academy in Ann Arbor, a community program for teaching science and mathematics to students in grades 5–12. She was also a member of The Links, Incorporated. Additionally, Moore was a member of the Delta Sigma Theta sorority and also a member of the Bethel African Methodist Episcopal Church. Moore was also a chairwomen of the Juanita S. Woods Scholarship fund and a part of the Jill and Jack of America organization.

Moore died of cancer in her Ann Arbor home on March 14, 1994.

== Legacy ==
In Moore's honor, the University of Michigan Women in Science and Engineering office established the Willie Hobbs Moore Awards, created to honor faculty, staff, and students who demonstrate excellence promoting equity in STEM. Four awards are given out at the ceremony: the Willie Hobbs Moore Achievement Award for achievements in STEM, the Sister Mary Ambrosia Fitzgerald Mentoring Award for exemplary mentorship of STEM students, the Claudia Joan Alexander Trailblazer Award for innovation in STEM education, and the Cinda Sue Davis STEM Equity Leadership Award for excellence promoting diversity, equity, and inclusion across a successful career.

The University of Michigan department of Electrical & Computer Engineering invites alumni from underrepresented groups to give their ECE Willie Hobbs Moore Alumni Lecture, a lecture series aimed at bringing together professional leaders with the university community.

== Selected Publications ==
- Moore, W.H.; Ching, J.H.C.; Warrier, A.V.R.; Krimm, S. (October 1973). "Assignment of torsion and low frequency bending vibrations of secondary chlorides". Spectrochimica Acta Part A: Molecular Spectroscopy. 29 (10): 1847–1858. doi: 10.1016/0584-8539(73)80169-2
- Moore, W. H.; Krimm, S. (November 1973). "Calculated intermolecular interactions in secondary chlorides". The Journal of Chemical Physics. 59 (9): 5195–5196. doi: 10.1063/1.1680738.
- Moore, W.H.; Krimm, S. (December 1973). "A complete general valence force field for secondary chlorides". Spectrochimica Acta Part A: Molecular Spectroscopy. 29 (12): 2025–2042.doi:10.1016/0584-8539(73)80061-3.
- Moore, W.H. and Krimm S. (June 1975). "The Vibrational Spectrum of Crystalline Syndiotactic Poly(vinyl chloride)", Die Makromoleculare Chemie, Suppl. 1 (S19751): 491-506. doi:10.1002/macp.1975.020011975134
- Hsu, S. L.; Moore, W. H.; Krimm, S. (October 1975). "A vibrational analysis of crystalline trans‐1,4‐polybutadiene". Journal of Applied Physics. 46 (10): 4185–4193. doi:10.1063/1.321430
- Moore, W. H.; Krimm, S. (December 1, 1975). "Transition dipole coupling in Amide I modes of βpolypeptides". Proceedings of the National Academy of Sciences. 72 (12): 4933–4935. doi:10.1073/pnas.72.12.4933.
- Hsu, S.L., Moore, W.H. and Krimm, S. (August 1976). "Vibrational spectrum of the unordered polypeptide chain: A Raman study of feather keratin". Biopolymers. 15 (8): 1512-1528. doi: 10.1002/bip.1976.360150807
- Moore, W.H. and Krimm, S. (December 1976). "Vibrational analysis of peptides, polypeptides, and proteins. I. Polyglycine I." Biopolymers 15 (12): 2439-2462. doi: 10.1002/bip.1976.360151210
- Rabolt, J. F.; Moore, W. H.; Krimm, S. (September 1977). "Vibrational Analysis of Peptides, Polypeptides, and Proteins. 3. α-Poly(L-alanine)". Macromolecules. 10 (5): 1065–1074. doi:10.1021/ma60059a034
- Wu, Yuin and Wille Hobbs Moore. Quality Engineering Products and Process Design Optimization. American Supplier Institute, 1986.
