= Chester Snow =

American mathematician

Chester Snow (June 1, 1881 – January 13, 1970) was an American applied mathematician and physicist, known for his work on formulas for computing capacitance and inductance.

Snow was born in Salt Lake City, Utah. After attending Ogden High School and Utah Agricultural College, Snow matriculated at Harvard University in 1903 and graduated there with an A.B. in 1906. At Brigham Young University he was a professor of physics from 1906 to 1911 and a professor of mathematics from 1911 to 1912. From 1912 to 1914 he was a fellow in physics at the University of Wisconsin, where he received his Ph.D. in 1914. At the University of Idaho mathematics department he was an associate professor from 1914. In 1920 he resigned from the University of Idaho to accept a position as a physicist at the Bureau of Standards in Washington, D.C. In 1924 he was an Invited Speaker of the ICM in Toronto.

== Selected publications ==
- "The Magneto-Optical Parameters of Iron and Nickel." Physical Review 2, no. 1 (1913): 29.
- "Spectroradiometric analysis of radio signals." National Bureau of Standards (1923).
- "Alternating current distribution in cylindrical conductors." US Government Printing Office, 1925.
- with M. Katherine Frehafer: "Tables and graphs for facilitating the computation of spectral energy distribution by Planck's formula." Miscellaneous Publications Dealing with Standards Vol. 56 (1925): np.
- 'Formula for the inductance of a helix made with wire of any section." US Government Printing Office, 1926.
- "Effect of eddy currents in a core consisting of circular wires." National Bureau of Standards (1927).
- "Mutual inductance and force between two coaxial helical wires." Journal of Research of the National Bureau of Standards (1939): 239–269.
- "Potential problems and capacitance for a conductor bounded by two intersecting spheres." Journal of Research of the National Bureau of Standards 43, no. 4 (1949): 377.
- "Hypergeometric and Legendre functions with applications to integral equations of potential theory." NBS Applied Math. Vol. 19. Washington (DC): US Government Printing Office, 1952. 1st edition. 1942.
- "Magnetic fields of cylindrical coils and annular coils." NBS Applied Math. Vol. 38. Washington (DC): National Bureau of Standards, US Govt. Printing Office (1953).
- "Formulas for computing capacitance and inductance." Vol. 544. US Govt. Printing Office (1954).
