= L. T. E. Thompson =

American physicist

Louis Ten Eyck Thompson
- Born: October 24, 1891; South Haven, Michigan
- Died: December 13, 1978 (aged 87)
- Other names: Tec
- Scientific career
- Fields: Ballistics

Louis Ten Eyck Thompson (October 24, 1891 in South Haven, Michigan – December 13, 1978) known as Dr. Tommy) was an American physicist interested in thermodynamics and ballistics and as an expert working for the United States Navy from 1920 to 1954. He was the first technical director at the Naval Ordnance Test Station in California, where he was involved in work on the Manhattan Project, helping design the "gun" used to initiate nuclear explosives, and most involved in the development of rockets for naval and marine fighter aircraft.

Thompson received his Bachelor of Science degree from Kalamazoo College in 1914, Master of Arts degree in 1915 and Ph.D. in 1917 from Clark University in Worcester, Massachusetts. During 1917–1919 he was an assistant professor and fellow at Clark University, performing research on thermodynamics and ballistics.

The Naval Air Weapons Station China Lake named an award in his honor.
