= Gaurang Yodh =

Indian-American physicist (1928–2019)

Gaurang Bhaskar Yodh (November 24, 1928 – June 3, 2019) was an Indian-American physicist and an expert in astroparticle physics and cosmic-ray physics. He earned his B.Sc. at the University of Bombay in 1948 and his Ph.D. in physics at the University of Chicago in 1955. During his career, he held appointments at Stanford University, Carnegie-Mellon University, and the University of Maryland, before joining the faculty at the University of California, Irvine in 1988. Yodh was a Fellow of the American Physical Society and an Elected Fellow of the American Association for the Advancement of Science.

The Yodh Prize was established by Yodh and his wife Kanwal to recognize a scientist whose research career has had a major impact on the understanding of cosmic rays. It is administered by the Commission on Astroparticle Physics of the International Union of Pure and Applied Physics and was first awarded in 2001.

He was also an accomplished amateur sitar player, frequently entertaining guests in his home. In 1956 he recorded an album of five ragas for ABC records, London, entitled Music of India (Westminster – WAF 202 / XWN 18258 US).

Yodh died on June 3, 2019 in Irvine, California, at the age of 90.
