= Wulf Bernard Kunkel =

Wulf Bernard Kunkel (6 February 1923, Eichenau, Germany – 3 September 2013, Oakland, California) was a German-born American physicist, specializing in plasma physics, especially "the development of ion beams for plasma heating".

Kunkel attended the International Quaker School Eerde in Eerde, Ommen in the Netherlands. During the Second World War, he studied physics at the University of Amsterdam. After WW II ended, he studied physics at the University of California, Berkeley (UC Berkeley), where he graduated with bachelor's degree in 1948 and PhD in 1951. From 1951 to 1956 he worked at UC Berkeley's Institute of Engineering Research. In 1956 he joined the UC Radiation Laboratory (renamed in 1958 the Lawrence Berkeley National Laboratory, LBNL) and also became a lecturer in the physics department, UC Berkeley. There he was a full professor from 1967 to 1991, when he retired as professor emeritus. From 1971 to 1991 he served as leader of LBNL's fusion research program.

Kunkel was a Guggenheim Fellow for the two academic years 1955–1956 and 1972–1973. He was elected a Fellow of the American Physical Society in 1955. He received Germany's Alexander von Humboldt Award in 1982.

Kunkel’s research focused on astrophysics, basic aspects of plasma physics, controlled nuclear fusion power, developing novel powerful deuterium injectors for heating, ionization phenomena in gases, plasma in the large magnetic confinement fusion experiments, and space science.

Upon his death he was survived by his widow, three children, and two grandchildren.

== Selected publications ==
- Kunkel, Wulf B. (1948). "Magnitude and Character of Errors Produced by Shape Factors in Stokes' Law Estimates of Particle Radius". Journal of Applied Physics. 19 (11): 1056–1058. Bibcode:1948JAP....19.1056K. doi:10.1063/1.1698010.
- Kunkel, W. B. (1950). "The Static Electrification of Dust Particles on Dispersion into a Cloud". Journal of Applied Physics. 21 (8): 820–832. Bibcode:1950JAP....21..820K. doi:10.1063/1.1699765.
- Anderson, Oscar; Baker, William R.; Bratenahl, Alexander; Furth, Harold P.; Kunkel, Wulf B. (1959). "Hydromagnetic Capacitor". Journal of Applied Physics. 30 (2): 188–196. Bibcode:1959JAP....30..188A. doi:10.1063/1.1735132.
- Robben, Frank; Kunkel, Wulf B.; Talbot, Lawrence (1963). "Spectroscopic Study of Electron Recombination with Monatomic Ions in a Helium Plasma". Physical Review. 132 (6): 2363–2371. Bibcode:1963PhRv..132.2363R. doi:10.1103/PhysRev.132.2363.
- Kunkel, W. B., ed. (1966). Plasma Physics in Theory and Application. McGraw-Hill; 494 pages
- Sherwood, Arthur R.; Kunkel, Wulf B. (1968). "Formative Time for Breakdown in Strong Crossed Fields". Journal of Applied Physics. 39 (5): 2343–2348. Bibcode:1968JAP....39.2343S. doi:10.1063/1.1656557.
- Brown, Ian G.; Compher, Alan B.; Kunkel, Wulf B. (1971). "Response of a Langmuir Probe in a Strong Magnetic Field". Physics of Fluids. 14 (7): 1377. Bibcode:1971PhFl...14.1377B. doi:10.1063/1.1693617.
- Kunkel, Wulf B. (1979). "Multimegawatt Neutral Beams for Tokamaks". IEEE Transactions on Nuclear Science. 26 (3): 4166–4171. doi:10.1109/TNS.1979.4330733. S2CID 9357022. 1979 (This paper "describes the use and future of high-power neutral-beam injectors to heat plasma."
- Walther, S. R.; Leung, K. N.; Kunkel, W. B. (1988). "Production of H^{−} ions with addition of cesium or xenon to a hydrogen discharge in a small multicusp ion source". Journal of Applied Physics. 64 (7): 3424–3428. Bibcode:1988JAP....64.3424W. doi:10.1063/1.341498.
- Leung, K. N.; Hauck, C. A.; Kunkel, W. B.; Walther, S. R. (1989). "Optimization of H^{−} production from a small multicusp ion source". Review of Scientific Instruments. 60 (4): 531–538. Bibcode:1989RScI...60..531L. doi:10.1063/1.1140359.
- Leung, K. N.; Devries, G. J.; Divergilio, W. F.; Hamm, R. W.; Hauck, C. A.; Kunkel, W. B.; McDonald, D. S.; Williams, M. D. (1991). "rf driven multicusp H^{−} ion source". Review of Scientific Instruments. 62 (1): 100–104. Bibcode:1991RScI...62..100L. doi:10.1063/1.1142315.
