= Shahpur =

Shahpur, Shapur, Shahpoor, or Shahapur (Persian: شاه پور) may refer to:

== People ==
- Shapur (name), Persian given name and a list of people with the name

== Places ==
=== India ===
==== Bihar ====
- Shahpur, Bihar, a city in Bhojpur district
  - Shahpur, Bihar Assembly constituency
- Shahpur, Aurangabad, a village in Aurangabad district
- Shahpur, Araria, a village in Araria district
- Shahpur, Saharsa, a village in Saharsa district
- Shahpur Patori railway station in Shahpur Patori block

==== Delhi ====
- Shahpur Jat, an urban village in South Delhi

==== Gujarat ====
- Shahpur, Gujarat, a city and notified area in Ahmedabad district
- Shahpur, Kheralu, a village in Kheralu taluka, Mehsana district
- Shahpur Mosque, a mosque in Ahmedabad
- Shapur Sorath, a town in Junagadh district

==== Haryana ====
- Shahpur, Indri, a village in Indri City, Karnal district, Haryana
- Shahpur, Nissing, a village in Nissing, Karnal district, Haryana

==== Himachal Pradesh ====
- Shahpur, Kangra, a village in Kangra district, Himachal Pradesh
- Shahpur, Himachal Pradesh Assembly constituency

==== Jharkhand ====
- Shahpur, Jharkhand

==== Karnataka ====
- Shahapur, Karnataka, a city in Yadagiri district
  - Shahapur, Karnataka Assembly constituency
- Shahapur, Belgaum, a village in Belgaum district

==== Madhya Pradesh ====
- Shahpur, Betul, a census town in Betul district
- Shahpur, Berasia, a village in Berasia tehsil, Bhopal district
- Shahpur, Huzur, a village in Huzur tehsil, Bhopal district
- Shahpur, Burhanpur, a town and nagar panchayat in Burhanpur district
- Shahpur, Sagar, a town and nagar panchayat in Sagar district

==== Maharashtra ====
- Shahapur (Thane), a census town in Thane district
  - Shahapur, Maharashtra Assembly constituency
  - Shahapur taluka
- Shahapur, Bhandara, a census town in the Bhandara District
- Shahapur, Buldhana, a town and historic place in Khamgaon tehsil, Buldhana District
- Shahapur, Ichalkaranji, part of the city of Ichalkaranji, Kolhapur district

==== Punjab ====
- Shahpur, Phillaur, a village in Phillaur tehsil, Jalandhar District
- Shahpur Dogran, a village in Kapurthala district, Punjab

==== Telangana ====
- Shapur Nagar, a corporation ward in Hyderabad

==== Uttar Pradesh ====
- Shahpur, Pindra, a village in Pindra tehsil, Varanasi district
- Shahpur, Uttar Pradesh, a town and nagar panchayat in Muzaffarnagar district
- Shahpur Sirpura, a village in Sambhal district
- Shahpur, Chinhat, a village in Lucknow district
- Shahpur, Kakori, a village in Lucknow district
- Shahpur Majhgaon, a village in Lucknow district
- Shahpur Najol, a village in Lucknow district
- Shahpur Raja, a village in Lucknow district
- Shahpur, Lalganj, a village in Raebareli district

=== Iran (Persia) ===
- Shahpur, former name of Salmas, capital of Salmas County, West Azerbaijan Province
- Shapur cave, in the Zagros Mountains near Bishapur
- Shahpur Jan, village in the Central District, Shiraz County, Fars Province
- Shapur-Khwarrah, administrative division of the Sasanian province of Pars
- Shapur Rural District, in the Central District, Kazerun County, Fars Province
- Bandar Shahpur, former name of Bandar-e Emam Khomeyni, city in Mahshahr County, Khuzestan Province
- Jundi-Shapur or Gundeshapur, intellectual center of the Sassanid empire

=== Pakistan ===
- Shahpur, Punjab, a town in Sargodha District, Punjab province
  - Shahpur Tehsil, Pakistan
  - Shahpur District, historic district from 1893 to 1960, now called Shahpur Tehsil
- Shahpur Dam, a dam in Attock District on Nandana River in Punjab province
- Shahpur Chakar, a city in the Sanghar District, Sindh province
- Shahpur Jehanian, a town in Sindh province

== See also ==
- Shahpura (disambiguation)
- Shahabad (disambiguation)
- Shahpuri dialect, a dialect of Punjabi in Shahpur, Punjab, Pakistan
- Shapuree Island, Bangladesh
