= Shahabad =

Shahabad may refer to:

== India ==
- Shahabad Markanda, a town in Kurukshetra, Haryana, India
- Shahabad, Gulbarga, a town in Karnataka, India
  - Shahabad, Karnataka Assembly constituency
  - Shahabad railway station
- Shahabad, Hardoi, a town in Uttar Pradesh, India
  - Shahabad, Uttar Pradesh Lok Sabha constituency
  - Shahabad Assembly constituency
- Shahabad, Rampur, a town in Uttar Pradesh, India
- Shahabad, now Arrah, city in Bihar, India
  - Shahabad District, former district of Bihar, India
- Shahabad, Alwar, a village in Alwar, India
- Shahabad, Baran, a town and tehsil headquarter in Baran District Rajasthan
- Doru Shahabad, a town in Anantnag, Jammu and Kashmir, India
- Shahabad Lok Sabha constituency (disambiguation)

== Iran ==
=== East Azerbaijan Province ===
- Shah Abad-e-Mashayekh, a village in Tabriz County

=== Golestan Province ===
- Shahabad-e Parsah Su, a village in Golestan Province, Iran

=== Hamadan Province ===
- Shahabad, Hamadan, a village in Hamadan Province, Iran

=== Isfahan Province ===
- Shahabad, Isfahan, a village in Isfahan County
- Shahabad, Kuhpayeh, a village in Isfahan County

=== Kerman Province ===
- Shahabad, Fahraj, a village in Fahraj County
- Shahabad, Kerman, a village in Kerman County
- Shahabad, Rudbar-e Jonubi, a village in Rudbar-e Jonubi County
- Shahabad, Sirjan, a village in Sirjan County

=== Kermanshah Province ===
- Shahabad, Kermanshah, a city in Kermanshah Province, Iran

=== Khuzestan Province ===
- Shahabad-e Sadat, a village in Lali County

=== Lorestan Province ===
- Shahabad, Lorestan, a village in Lorestan Province, Iran
- Shahabad, alternate name of Eslamabad, Besharat, a village in Lorestan Province, Iran

=== Mazandaran Province ===
- Shahabad, Mazandaran, a city in Mazandaran Province, Iran

=== North Khorasan Province ===
- Shahabad, alternate name of Behkadeh-ye Razavi, a village in North Khorasan Province, Iran
- Shahabad, alternate name of Eslamabad-e Kord, a village in North Khorasan Province, Iran
- Shahabad-e Khavar, a village in North Khorasan Province, Iran

=== Razavi Khorasan Province ===
- Shahabad, Razavi Khorasan
- Shahabad-e Arab, a village in Razavi Khorasan Province, Iran
- Shahabad, alternate name of Eslamabad-e Lakazi, a village in Razavi Khorasan Province, Iran

=== Sistan and Baluchestan Province ===
- Shahabar, Sistan and Baluchestan, a village in Qasr-e Qand County

=== South Khorasan Province ===
- Khezri Dasht Beyaz, formerly Shahabad, a city in South Khorasan Province, Iran
- Shahabad, alternate name of Dastgerd, Birjand, a village in South Khorasan Province, Iran
- Shahabad, Tabas, a village in Tabas County

=== Tehran Province ===
- Shahabad, Tehran, a village in Qods County

=== West Azerbaijan Province ===
- Shahabad, Miandoab, a village in Miandoab County

== See also ==
- Shahabad, Iran (disambiguation)
- Shabad (disambiguation)
- Shahpur (disambiguation)
