= Pratappur =

Pratappur could refer to places in the Indian subcontinent:

- Pratappur, Uttar Pradesh Assembly constituency, a legislative assembly constituency in Allahabad district, and part of Bhadohi Lok Sabha constituency, Uttar Pradesh, India
- Sirjug Pratappur, a village in Bangladesh
- Pratappur, Jharkhand, a community development block in Chatra district in the Indian state of Jharkhand
- Pratappur, Chatra, a village in Chatra district, Jharkhand, India
- The ancient settlement of Marol in Mumbai
- Pratappur, Nepal
- Pratappur, Chhattisgarh
  - Pratappur, Chhattisgarh Assembly constituency, a legislative assembly constituency centered around the town
- Pratappur, Raebareli, a village in Uttar Pradesh, India
