= Axel Nielsen =

Danish astronomer

Axel Vilfred Nielsen (13 December 1902 – 24 February 1970) was a Danish astronomer at the Ole Rømer Observatory in Aarhus from 1927 until his death in 1970.

== Biography ==
Axel V. Nielsen was the son of Peder Adolf Nielsen (1872–1962) and Caroline Marie Nielsen (1873–1937). He grew up with his two younger brothers, Holger Marius Nielsen (1905–1993) and Povl Erik Nielsen (1909–1995) in Glostrup, 10 kilometres west of Copenhagen.

In 1921, while still a student, Nielsen established his private observatory "Spica" in Glostrup. The observatory was located on the premises of a local enterprise, Glostrup Træskofabrik, where Nielsen's father, Peder Adolf Nielsen, was employed as a manager. Axel V. Nielsen graduated in 1926 from the University of Copenhagen. In 1927, Nielsen was employed as an assistant with the Ole Rømer Observatory in Aarhus, later as head of section. The Ole Rømer Observatory had been established in 1911; in 1956 it was handed over to the University of Aarhus.

The crater Nielsen on the Moon is named after Axel V. Nielsen and the American physicist Harald Herborg Nielsen. Nielsen is a 10 km wide impact crater in the Oceanus Procellarum. It is located north-east of Montes Agricola.

== Works ==
Nielsen published several books and articles on astronomy and the history of astronomy in Denmark. In 1944 he published a major work on the Danish astronomer Ole Rømer (1644–1710). Nielsen's publication record includes:

- Ole Rømers ”Dimensionstavle", Nordisk Astronomisk Tidsskrift 1928, 30
- Ildkugler og Stjerneskud: Tidsskrift for Skole og Hjem. 2. Aarg. 8. Hft., Hellerup 1929
- The normal light curve, Astronomische Nachrichten, vol. 262, May 1937
- Hvornaar forelagde Ole Rømer sin Afhandling om Lysets Hastighed for Akademiet i Paris, NAT 1944, 60
- Ole Rømer. En Skildring af hans Liv og Gerning, København 1944
- Ole Rømers Triduum i det 18. århundredes astronomi, s. 205-223 i Vagn Dybdahl o.a.: Seksten Århusrids, Aarhus 1953
- Om iagttagelser af ildkugler, Aarhus 1958
- Helligtrekongersmindet astronomisk belyst, Aarhus 1959
- Hundrede års astronomi på Østervold, særtryk af Nordisk Astronomisk Tidsskrift 1961-62
- Ole Rømer-Observatoriet – dets oprindelse og dets første leder, Aarhus Stifts Årbøger, bind 55, Aarhus, 1962

== Sources ==
- "E.S.": Spica-Observatoriet (stud. mag. Axel Nielsen), Glostrup, Nordisk Astronomisk Tidsskrift 1922, 114.
- XVth General Assembly – Transactions of the IAU Vol. XV B, Proceedings of the Fifteenth General Assembly and Extraordinary General Assembly, Sydney, Australia, 21 – 30 August 1973, Eds. G. Contopoulos & A. Jappel, Association of Univ. for Research in Astronomy, ISBN 90-277-0451-1, 1974
