= Holger Nielsen (disambiguation) =

Holger Nielsen (1866–1955) was a Danish fencer, shooter, and athlete.

Holger Nielsen may also refer to:

- Holger Bech Nielsen, Danish physicist
- Holger K. Nielsen, Danish politician
- Holger Marius Nielsen, Danish education official
- The Holger Nielsen method of artificial respiration
