= Maha Khera =

- Village
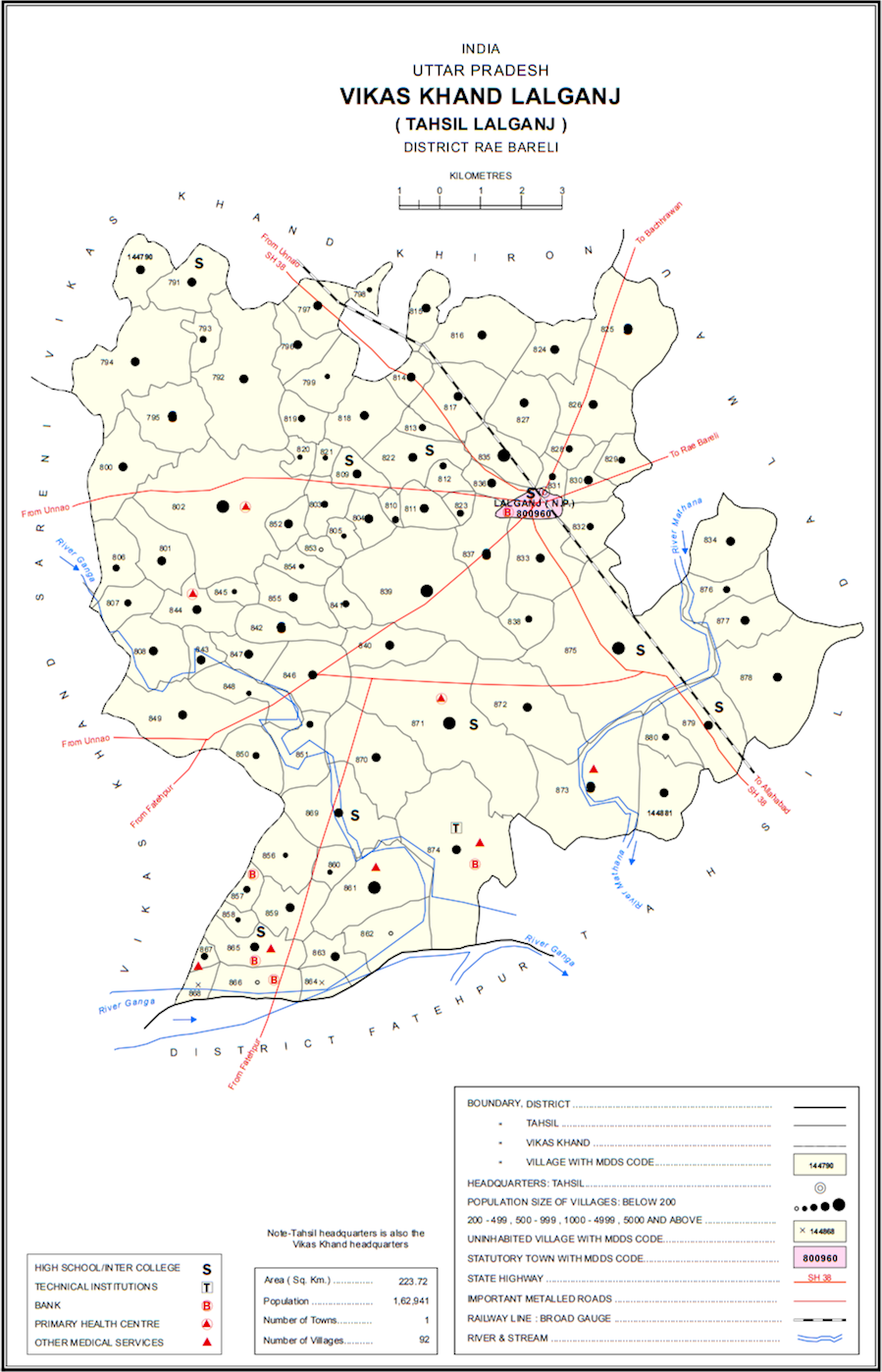
- Map showing Maha Khera (#804) in Lalganj CD block

- Location in Uttar Pradesh, India
- Coordinates: 26.162303°N 80.939026°E
- Country: India
- State: Uttar Pradesh
- District: Raebareli

Area
  - Total: 0.782 km^{2} (0.302 sq mi)

Population (2011)
  - Total: 1,515
  - Density: 1,940/km^{2} (5,020/sq mi)

Languages
  - Official: Hindi
- Time zone: UTC+5:30 (IST)
- Vehicle registration: UP-35

Maha Khera is a village in Lalganj block of Rae Bareli district, Uttar Pradesh, India. It is located 3 km from Lalganj, the block and tehsil headquarters. As of 2011, it has a population of 1,515 people, in 287 households. It has 1 primary school. The village has no healthcare facilities, nor hosts a permanent market or a weekly haat. It belongs to the nyaya panchayat of Behta Kalan.

The 1951 census recorded Maha Khera as comprising 2 hamlets, with a population of 741 people (365 male and 376 female), in 153 households and 127 physical houses. The area of the village was given as 195 acres. 118 residents were literate, 102 male and 16 female. The village was listed as belonging to the pargana of Sareni and the thana of Sareni.

The 1961 census recorded Maha Khera as comprising 1 hamlet, with a total population of 827 people (404 male and 423 female), in 162 households and 123 physical houses. The area of the village was given as 195 acres.

The 1981 census recorded Maha Khera as having a population of 917 people, in 187 households, and having an area of 79.33 hectares. The main staple foods were listed as wheat and rice.

The 1991 census recorded Maha Khera as having a total population of 1,010 people (494 male and 516 female), in 202 households and 202 physical houses. The area of the village was listed as 79 hectares. Members of the 0-6 age group numbered 206, or 20% of the total; this group was 52% male (108) and 48% female (98). Members of scheduled castes made up 59% of the village's population, while no members of scheduled tribes were recorded. The literacy rate of the village was 35% (261 men and 90 women). 222 people were classified as main workers (209 men and 13 women), while 10 people were classified as marginal workers (all women); the remaining 778 residents were non-workers. The breakdown of main workers by employment category was as follows: 92 cultivators (i.e. people who owned or leased their own land); 51 agricultural labourers (i.e. people who worked someone else's land in return for payment); 1 worker in livestock, forestry, fishing, hunting, plantations, orchards, etc.; 0 in mining and quarrying; 0 household industry workers; 62 workers employed in other manufacturing, processing, service, and repair roles; 0 construction workers; 8 employed in trade and commerce; 1 employed in transport, storage, and communications; and 7 in other services.
