= Anita Lerche =

Danish-American singer-songwriter

- Anita Lerche, Photographer Rob Slaven, Indy Ghost Light

Background information
- Born: December 21, 1973 (age 52); Glostrup, Copenhagen, Denmark
- Origin: Denmark
- Genres: Pop; Classical; Jazz; Folk; Western; Bhangra; Bollywood; Hindi Bhajans; Kirtan; Hymns
- Occupations: Singer-songwriter; Composer; Actress
- Years active: 2001–present
- Website: www.anitalerche.com

Anita Lerche (born 21 December 1973) is a Danish-American singer-songwriter, composer, and actress originating from Denmark. With the release of her album Heer from Denmark in November 2006, she became the first non-Asian woman from the west to release a solo album in Punjabi. In addition to singing in Punjabi, she has sung in a total of 16 different languages.

== Early life and education ==
Lerche was born on 21 December 1973 in Glostrup and grew up in Herlev, both suburbs of Copenhagen, in a musical household; her father, Mogens Flemming Lerche, sang and played guitar, and her great-grandfather Knud Peter Emil Nielsen had been a professional singer and musician.

She began singing publicly at age seven as a member of the Herlev School choir. At 13 she was accepted into the Radio Denmark choir and was chosen to sing in the children's opera Lykken og Forstanden. Two years later she began training in Western classical singing and took her first professional post as a church singer.

She went on to study piano performance—including works by Bach and Chopin—before training in musical theatre at the Mountview Academy of Theatre Arts in London. "I always wanted to become a professional. So I wanted to get a very good education," she has said. "I've had around 16 years of classical singing training. Musical theatre is a great way of expressing oneself, and I got some great tools for acting and dancing as well." After completing her degree in 2001, she performed in musical theatre productions in both London and Denmark.

== Career ==
=== Musical theatre and early recordings (2001–2005) ===
In 2001, Lerche performed the duet "Mit Hjerte Det Banker" ("My Heart Is Beating") with Simon Munk in Dansk Melodi Grand Prix, Denmark's branch of the Eurovision Song Contest. She also sang the American national anthem, "The Star-Spangled Banner," at the boxing match between Mike Tyson and Brian Nielsen. Her performance, at Parken Stadium in Copenhagen, was reportedly broadcast live worldwide to more than 200 million viewers.

After appearing in stage productions including Sommer i Tyrol (The White Horse Inn), where she played Annelise, Lerche released her debut solo album, I Love a Piano, in 2005, featuring musical-theatre and pop songs alongside covers of "The House of the Rising Sun" and Eric Clapton's "Tears in Heaven." She also contributed the track "Tid til Kærlighed" ("Time for Love") to the Danish telethon DM i indsamling 2005 – Forældreløse børn i Afrika, supporting orphaned children in Africa.

=== Turn toward Punjabi music (2005–2007) ===
While hiking in the Indian Himalayas in 2005, Lerche stayed at an orchard in the Parvati Valley of Himachal Pradesh owned by Anurag Sood. It was during her trek through the Parvati Valley that she came into contact with Indian tribal music, and her friend Gunnar Mühlmann, the tour organizer and a musician himself, suggested she record some of the tribal songs with the tribal people as an "East-Meets-West" project. Sood liked the idea enough to invite her to his home in Hoshiarpur to record the songs. Travelling by bus into Punjab, Lerche heard Punjabi music for the first time on the vehicle's radio. "The music and the rhythms were so inspiring, I wanted to dance there and then in the bus," she later said. "I felt that this was the music I had been looking for."

She cancelled her scheduled concerts in Europe and remained in India to study Punjabi music and culture, spending three months in Hoshiarpur, where Sood's family helped her learn to sing in Punjabi. She received further instruction from the late Rattan Singh Rajput, who was one of the driving forces behind her first Punjabi album and who also taught her Hindi, Bollywood song, and Hindu devotional bhajans. "Rattan Singh Rajput taught and rectified all the pronunciation and meanings of my lyrics and the stories behind my songs," Lerche has said.

Lerche released her first Punjabi-language album, Heer from Denmark, in 2006. The album drew wide press coverage in India; it was praised as capturing audiences across the country with what one source called her "unique and electrifying performances." Songs were drawn from multiple songwriters, including Chann Gorayanwala, who wrote "Passport," and Satwinder Bhanewala, who wrote "Gori"; Lerche herself wrote the track "Goddess." Producer Satvinder Singh said of the release, "With lot of hard work, today we got success."

The album's rendition of the traditional song "Heer," based on the classic Punjabi romance Heer Ranjha by Waris Shah, drew particular praise; one report attributed to The Times of India said that, from her style and pronunciation, listeners might assume she was Punjabi. The album went on to earn Best NRI Female Debut at the 2007 Limca Punjabi Music Awards (see Awards and honors).

=== Establishing a career in Punjabi music (2007–2013) ===
Lerche wrote Hindi songs supporting the Indian national cricket team during the 2007 and 2011 Cricket World Cups, set to the tune of her song "Gori," and performed them on Indian television, including a live appearance for the team on STAR TV India in 2007.

In 2009 she collaborated with rapper Cheshire Cat on "Maahiya," blending her Punjabi vocals with reggae rap. The track won World Music Track of the Year at the 2009 Danish Music Awards, which she has said was the first time she received a major award from her home country.

In 2010 she recorded "Aao Ji" with Yaz Alexander, Kiureli Sammallathi, and Skibu, produced by Bhangra musician King Gurcharan Mall with his drum group, Dhol Blasters.

Lerche's ambition to perform in a Bollywood film was the subject of the 2010 Danish television documentary Fra Herlev til Bollywood ("From Herlev to Bollywood"), directed by Gry Louise Kolind, which followed her attempts to break into the Bollywood industry and was broadcast on DR2. "I know if I have the passion, and work hard, I have a chance, because I carry a Bollywood dream in my heart," Lerche said of the project. "And I know everything is possible in India!" Kolind said the documentary was intended to show viewers who is involved in the Bollywood industry and how someone already well known in Denmark might fare trying to break into it.

In 2011 Lerche featured on the musical drama recording The Bollywood Trip, singing "Soniye" (with Vicky Singh and Stephan Grabowski) and "Mahiya Ve" (with Grabowski). A second documentary about her career and connection to Punjabi culture, Kashish Punjab Di, produced by Agiapal Singh Randhawa, aired on India's DD Punjabi in 2012.

Her third album, Sadke Punjab Ton, was previewed through singles released across 2013—the title track and "Sammi," both produced by Gurmoh with lyrics by Dr. Tejinder Harjit, and "Merea Ranjha"—before the full album's release in October 2014. Lerche has said "Merea Ranjha" was inspired by both her personal life and the Heer Ranjha legend. "Heer Ranjha, by Waris Shah, has inspired me a lot throughout the years," she said, "and on a full-moon night a few years ago, I suddenly felt this profound desire and was longing more than ever to be united with my Ranjha. 'Merea Ranjha' came to life at this moment."

In December 2013, Lerche performed at a fundraiser for Christel House International in Indianapolis. Sikh community leader KP Singh praised her role in introducing Sikh sacred and Bhangra music to Western audiences.

In 2014 Lerche moved to the United States on a green card, describing herself as "a unique artist in Punjabi culturally inspired music," and joined the Chicago chapter of the National Academy of Recording Arts and Sciences.

=== Devotional music and later career (2014–present) ===
Lerche's fourth album, Bhajans (2016), was her first full-length Hindi release, comprising eight devotional songs. It debuted at No. 6 on the Billboard New Age Albums chart as a "Hot Shot Debut" and No. 11 on the World Albums chart, later peaking at No. 5 and No. 6 respectively.

In 2018 the Indian Embassy in Copenhagen selected her to represent Denmark in a video collaboration of Mahatma Gandhi's favourite bhajan, "Vaishnav Jan To," filmed in Nyhavn and Tivoli Gardens. The video was launched by Indian prime minister Narendra Modi as part of Gandhi's 150th birth-anniversary celebrations.

In 2019 she became a radio host on Rukus Avenue Radio, described as the largest South Asian radio station on Dash Radio, with a weekly devotional and world-music show over the following two years. Her fifth album, Love Is My Religion (2020), was co-produced with Grammy-winning slack-key guitarist Jim "Kimo" West and reviewed by Best New Age CDs.

Lerche performed her first Sikh Shabad in 2012 and has since performed at Gurdwaras worldwide. Her 2022 single "Simran" recreates the Sikh devotional tradition of rhythmic chanting during worship. Her 2023 single "Mil Mere Pritma Jiyo," released on Hola Mohalla and International Women's Day, was filmed in Punjab's Gurdwaras and along the Beas River by filmmaker Dr. Harjit Singh, with visuals of Lerche shot by Emmy-winning videographer Nate Heck.

In 2023 she performed her original Punjabi songs at New York Fashion Week, on the runway at Gotham Hall representing Randhawa Brands. Her 2024 album Songs from the Kingdom of Denmark is an homage to her Danish heritage and received several award nominations (see Awards and honors). She has also been featured as a devotional singer in the "Sacred Places" exhibit at The Children's Museum of Indianapolis, with her live performance of "Mil Mere Pritma Jiyo" documented during Vaisakhi celebrations at the city's oldest Sikh Gurdwara.

=== Voice acting ===
Lerche has worked as a Danish-language voice actor for Disney and Pixar films and for a Barbie book series, having been recruited by Danish actor and producer Lars Thiesgaard. She and Thiesgaard both appeared in Toy Story 2, Toy Story 3, and Planes.

Voice roles
Year	Title	Role
2017	Cars 3	Sweet Tea (Tutte) & Commercial Narrator
2014	Toy Story (Short Stories) – Vacation à la Hawaii	Barbie
2013	Planes	Ishani
2010	Toy Story 3	Barbie
2000	102 Dalmatians	Various voices
1999	Toy Story 2	Tour Guide Barbie
1998	Barbie og undulaten (audiobook)	Barbie
1997	Barbie på sydhavsøen (audiobook)	Barbie
1997	Beauty and the Beast: The Enchanted Christmas	Various voices

=== Soundtracks ===
Film soundtrack contributions
Year	Film	Song	Notes
2015	Jackpot pe Jackpot	"Mela"	Directed by Deepak Ochaney; lyrics by Satwinder Bhanewala, music by the Jassi Brothers
2010	Submarino	"Heer"	Directed by Thomas Vinterberg; lyrics by Waris Shah (traditional), produced by the Jassi Brothers

== Personal life ==
Lerche married Danish-born Søren Hjorth in 2014, with ceremonies held in Denmark, India, and the United States; the couple's traditional Punjabi wedding took place in Hoshiarpur, Punjab, that November and coincided with the release of Sadke Punjab Ton. "I am so much in love with Punjabi culture and tradition," she said. "I always wanted to have an Indian wedding." The wedding was covered on Jagbani TV.

=== Humanitarian work ===
At a benefit in Ludhiana, Lerche told local media, "We all have one heart." "I deeply feel that we all have an obligation to support the people in need," she has said.

She has performed benefit concerts for Indianapolis-based Christel House International in 2013, 2014, 2015, 2016, and 2017, supporting education programs in India, Mexico, South Africa, and the United States; the concerts have raised more than $536,000 for the charity to date.

Lerche has also partnered with Little Big Help, which supports impoverished children in Kolkata's slums. She performed at a Copenhagen charity fundraiser in late 2010 and again at a second fundraiser in 2016. She has also supported Pingalwara, a home for the disabled in Amritsar, performing a Punjabi children's song for residents during a visit. In 2016 she was featured on Music to Inspire, a compilation produced by Rukus Avenue and the UN Blue Heart Campaign against human trafficking. Before her move into Indian music, she took part in the 2005 Danish telethon supporting orphaned children in Africa.

== Awards and honors ==
Year	Award	From	Notes
2024	World Artist of the Year (nominated)	The Josie Music Awards	Songs from the Kingdom of Denmark
2024	Best Vocalist	InterContinental Music Awards	"I Danmark Er Jeg Født" – Songs from the Kingdom of Denmark
2024	Gold Medal, Female Vocalist	Global Music Awards	Songs from the Kingdom of Denmark
2023	Best International Artist (nominated)	UK Bhangra Awards	
2023	World Artist of the Year (nominated)	The Josie Music Awards	Multiple languages
2023	Best Music Video	Clouzine International Music Awards	"Mil Mere Pritma Jiyo"
2023	Silver Medal, Female Vocalist	Global Music Awards	"Mil Mere Pritma Jiyo"
2022	Best International Artist (nominated)	UK Bhangra Awards	
2022	Silver Medal, Female Vocalist	Global Music Awards	"Simran"
2021	Best International Artist (nominated)	UK Bhangra Awards	
2020	Silver Medal, Female Vocalist	Global Music Awards	Love Is My Religion
2020	Best International Artist (nominated)	UK Bhangra Awards	
2019	Special Contribution Award	UK Bhangra Awards	
2018	Honor, Child Aid Ambassador	Action Child Aid (Aktion Børnehjælp)	
2017	Best International Artist	UK Bhangra Awards	
2017	Honor	Punjabi Cultural Society of Chicago	Appreciation Award for promoting Punjabi folk music and culture
2017	Honor (×2)	Khalsa Library Society	For dedication to Sikhism and the Punjabi language, and for service to the Khalsa Library
2017	Honor	Sukhi Bath Foundation	Outstanding Achievement Award
2016	Best World/Global Fusion Album (nominated)	One World Music Awards	Bhajans
2016	Honor	Greater Indianapolis Telugu Association	For promoting Indian music and culture
2014	Honor	Indy Legends Cricket Club	
2014	Honor	Punjabi Cultural & Welfare Association, Navi Mumbai	For service to humanity and Punjabis worldwide
2013	Conspicuous Singer	Global Punjabi Society	
2013	World Music Track of the Year (nominated)	Danish Music Awards	"Sadke Punjab Ton"
2013	Rooh-E-Punjab (Soul of Punjab)	International Punjabi Culture Society, Shamchurasi	
2012	Ambassador for Peace	Universal Peace Federation / Interreligious and International Federation for World Peace	
2012	International Ambassador of Multiculturalism	Patel Brothers Group, Sydney	After performing at the finale of the 2012 Indian Australian Dancing Star contest
2012	World Music Track of the Year (nominated)	Danish Music Awards	"Soniye," from The Bollywood Trip
2012	Rotary Star Award	Rotary Club Jalandhar West	
2010	Cultural Ambassador for Women Globally	The Global Women's Network	
2010	Pride of the Indians Award	Indian Cultural Society Denmark	
2009	World Music Track of the Year	Danish Music Awards	"Maahiya" featuring Cheshire Cat
2007	The Sita Mata Award	New Dharmik Utsav Sabha, Jalandhar	For Hindi bhajan performances at Ram Navami celebrations
2007	Best NRI Female Debut	Limca Punjabi Music Awards / MH1	Heer from Denmark
2006	Honor	Punjabi University, Patiala	For promotion of the Punjabi language and culture
2001	Gold record (25,000 copies)	Dansk Melodi Grand Prix	"Mit Hjerte Det Banker," with Simon Munk
2001	Platinum record (50,000 copies)	Dansk Melodi Grand Prix	"Mit Hjerte Det Banker," with Simon Munk

== Discography ==
Year	Title	Type
2024	Songs from the Kingdom of Denmark	Album
2023	"Mil Mere Pritma Jiyo"	Single
2022	"Simran"	Single
2020	Love Is My Religion	Album
2020	"Love Is My Religion"	Single
2018	"Vaishnav Jan To"	Single / collaboration video
2017	"Vem Kan Segla"	From Music to Inspire – Artists United Against Human Trafficking (compilation)
2016	Bhajans	Album
2014	Sadke Punjab Ton	Album
2014	"Vem Kan Segla"	From Ballroom Stars 5 (compilation)
2013	"Merea Ranjha"	Single
2013	"Sammi"	Single
2013	"Sadke Punjab Ton"	Single
2011	"Mahiya Ve" & "Soniye"	From The Bollywood Trip (collaboration)
2010	"Aao Ji"	Collaboration
2009	"Maahiya" (feat. Cheshire Cat)	Single
2006	Heer from Denmark	Album
2005	I Love a Piano	Album
2005	"Tid til Kærlighed"	Single
2001	"Mit Hjerte Det Banker"	Single
