= Harald Herborg Nielsen =

American physicist

Harald Herborg Nielsen (January 25, 1903 – January 8, 1973) was an American physicist.

== Biography ==
He was born in Menominee, Michigan, to Knud Nielsen and Maren Sorensen, immigrant parents who had moved to the United States from Denmark. He was the brother of Alvin H. Nielsen.

His college education was attained at the University of Michigan, where he earned a Ph.D. He then spent a year at the Bohr's Institute in Copenhagen as a Scandinavian-American Fellow. In 1930 he joined the Ohio State University, where he remained until his retirement.

Much of his work at OSU involved the infrared spectra of molecules; particularly with regard to their vibrational-rotational energies. He performed pioneering design work with high-resolution spectrographs, and made major theoretical contributions on molecular spectra.

From 1946 until 1967 he was chairman of the physics department. He held a Guggenheim Fellowship at Cambridge University from 1949 to 1950, served as science attaché for the U.S. Embassy in Stockholm from 1952 to 1953, and was a Fulbright Lecturer, University of Paris from 1958 to 1959. He also served as editor of the Journal of Molecular Spectroscopy.

He died on January 8, 1973, in Columbus, Ohio.

== Awards and honors ==
- Fellow of the American Physical Society.
- Elected to the Cosmos Club, 1954.
- Cross of the Order of Leopold (Belgium), 1953.
- Cross of the Order of Knights of Dannebrog, Denmark, 1957.
- University Medal, University of Liège.
- Honorary doctorate, University of Dijon.
- The lunar crater Nielsen is co-named for him and Axel Nielsen.
