= Shapur (name) =

Shāpūr (Persian: شاپور, meaning son of the king), Sepuh, Shapour, Shahpur, Sapor, or Shapoor (شاهپور) is a masculine given name of Persian origin. It is popular in Iran and other Persian speaking countries. It is first attested in Middle Persian as Shāhpuhr (𐭱𐭧𐭯𐭥𐭧𐭥𐭩). The Armenian form is Շապուհ Šapuh or Սեպուհ Sepuh. Notable people with the name include:

== Given name ==
=== Sapor ===
- Sapor (died 421), early Persian Christian martyr
- Sapor of Bet-Nicator (died 339), Christian bishop

=== Sebouh ===
- Sebouh David Aslanian, Armenian historian
- Sebouh Chouldjian (1959–2020), Armenian Apostolic prelate
- Sebouh Kalpakian, Lebanese Armenian politician
- Sebouh Nersesian (1872–1940), Armenian military commander

=== Sepuh ===
- Sepuh Sargsyan (born 1946), Armenian Apostolic prelate

=== Shahpur ===
- Shahpur Shah Durrani (died 1884), ruler of Afghanistan

=== Shapoor ===
- Shapoor Gharib (1933–2012), Iranian director and screenplay writer
- Shapoor Reporter (1921–2013), British intelligence agent
- Shapoor Zadran (1987–2026), Afghan cricketer

=== Shapour ===
- Shapour Azarbarzin (1930–2015), Iranian fighter pilot
- Shapour Bakhtiar (1914–1991), Iranian politician
- Shapour Bonyad (1947–2000), Iranian poet
- Shapour Marhaba (born 1957), Iranian politician

=== Shapur ===
- Shapur of Ray, marzban of Persian Armenia
- Shapur (Bavandid ruler) (died 825), ruler of the Bavand dynasty
- Shapur (son of Pabag) (died 211/12), Iranian prince
- Shapur I (died 270), Sasanian King of Kings of Iran
- Shapur II (309–379), Sasanian King of Kings of Iran
- Shapur III (died 388), Sasanian King of Kings of Iran
- Shapur IV (died 420), Sasanian King of Kings of Iran
- Shapur Bakhtiar (1915–1991), Iranian politician
- Shapur Kharegat (1932–2000), Indian Parsi journalist and editor
- Shapur Meshanshah (died 260), Sasanian prince
- Shapur Mihran, marzban of Persian Armenia
- Shapur ibn Sahl (died 869), Persian physician
- Shapur Sakanshah, Sasanian prince
- Shapur-i Shahrvaraz, Sasanian King of Kings of Iran

== Places ==
- Anbar, Iraq was known as Peroz-Shapur in ancient times.

== Other ==
- Shapur, a character in Nizami Ganjavi's tale Khusraw and Shirin
- Shapoorji Pallonji Group, Indian business conglomerate

== See also ==
- Shahpur (disambiguation)
