= Alvin Andreas Herborg Nielsen =

American physicist in molecular spectroscopy

Alvin H. Nielsen (30 May 1910 – 3 November 1994) was an American physicist in molecular spectroscopy.

== Life ==
Nielsen was born in Menominee, Michigan. He graduated from the University of Michigan, taught at the Ohio State University, and then relocated to the University of Tennessee in 1935. He spent 1951 to 1952 at the Astrophysical Institute in Liège. Nielsen achieved widespread recognition for his work in spectroscopy and wrote eighty-five publications. He served as chairman of the physics department at the University of Tennessee. He was the brother of Harald Herborg Nielsen.

== Honors ==
In 1980, the University of Tennessee at Knoxville named its physics building the Alvin H. Nielsen Physics Building in Nielsen's honor.
