= Shahabad Lok Sabha constituency =

Shahabad Lok Sabha constituency could refer to one of the following defunct constitiuencies in India:

- Shahabad, Bihar Lok Sabha constituency
- Shahabad, Uttar Pradesh Lok Sabha constituency

== See also ==
- Shahabad (disambiguation)
