= Glostrup =

Danish city

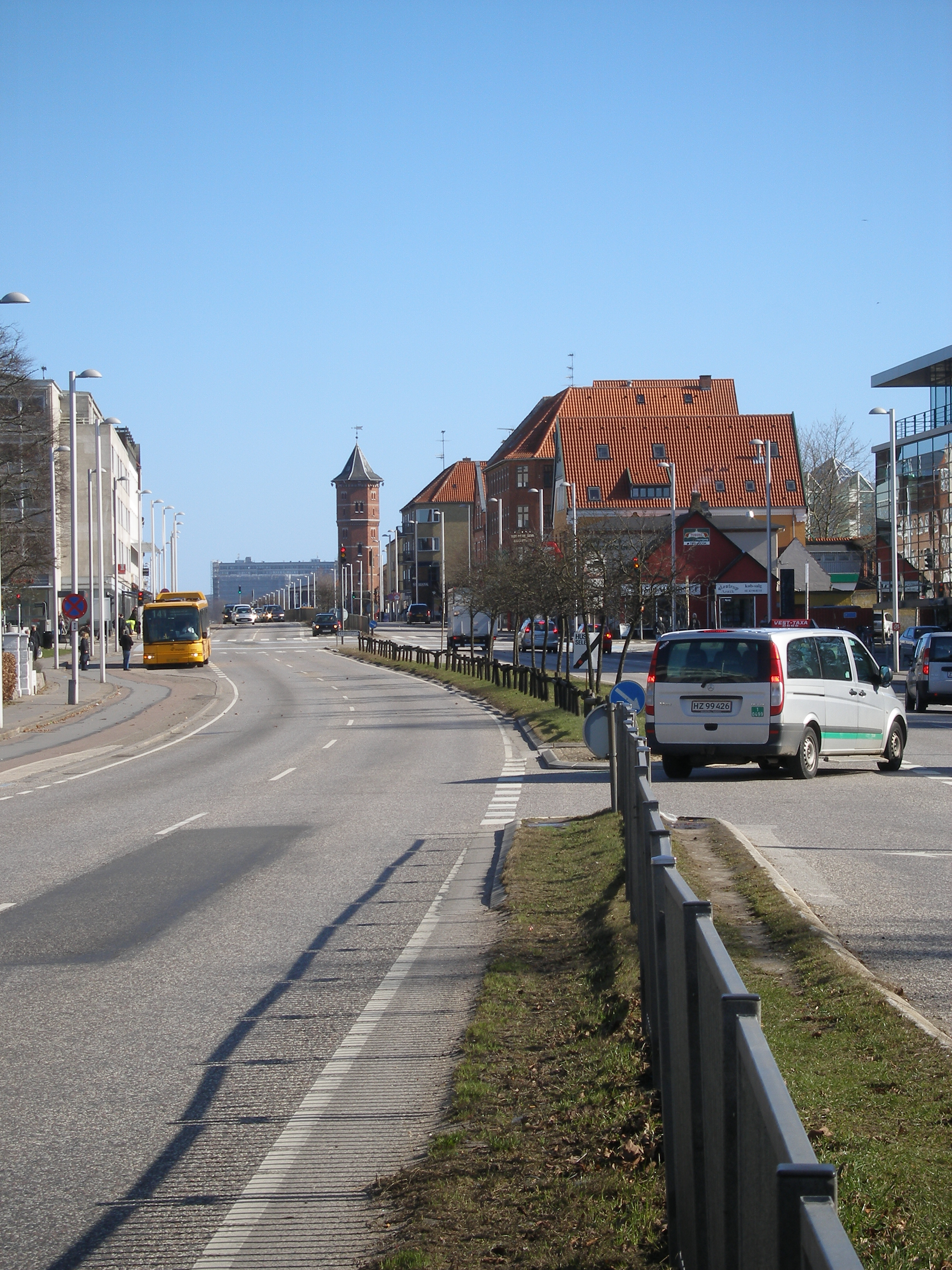
- Hovedgaden, Glostrup's main street with the iconic water tower

- Location within Greater Copenhagen
- Coordinates: 55°39′46″N 12°23′50″E
- Country: Denmark
- Region: Capital Region
- Municipality: Glostrup

Population (2024)
  - Urban: 23,540
  - Municipality: 23,650
- Time zone: UTC+1 (CET)
  - Summer (DST): UTC+2 (CEST)
- Postal code: 2600
- Website: http://www.glostrup.dk/

Glostrup is a Danish town in Region Hovedstaden, forming one of the western suburbs of Copenhagen. It is the administrative seat of Glostrup Municipality, with an estimated population of 23,540 as of 2024.

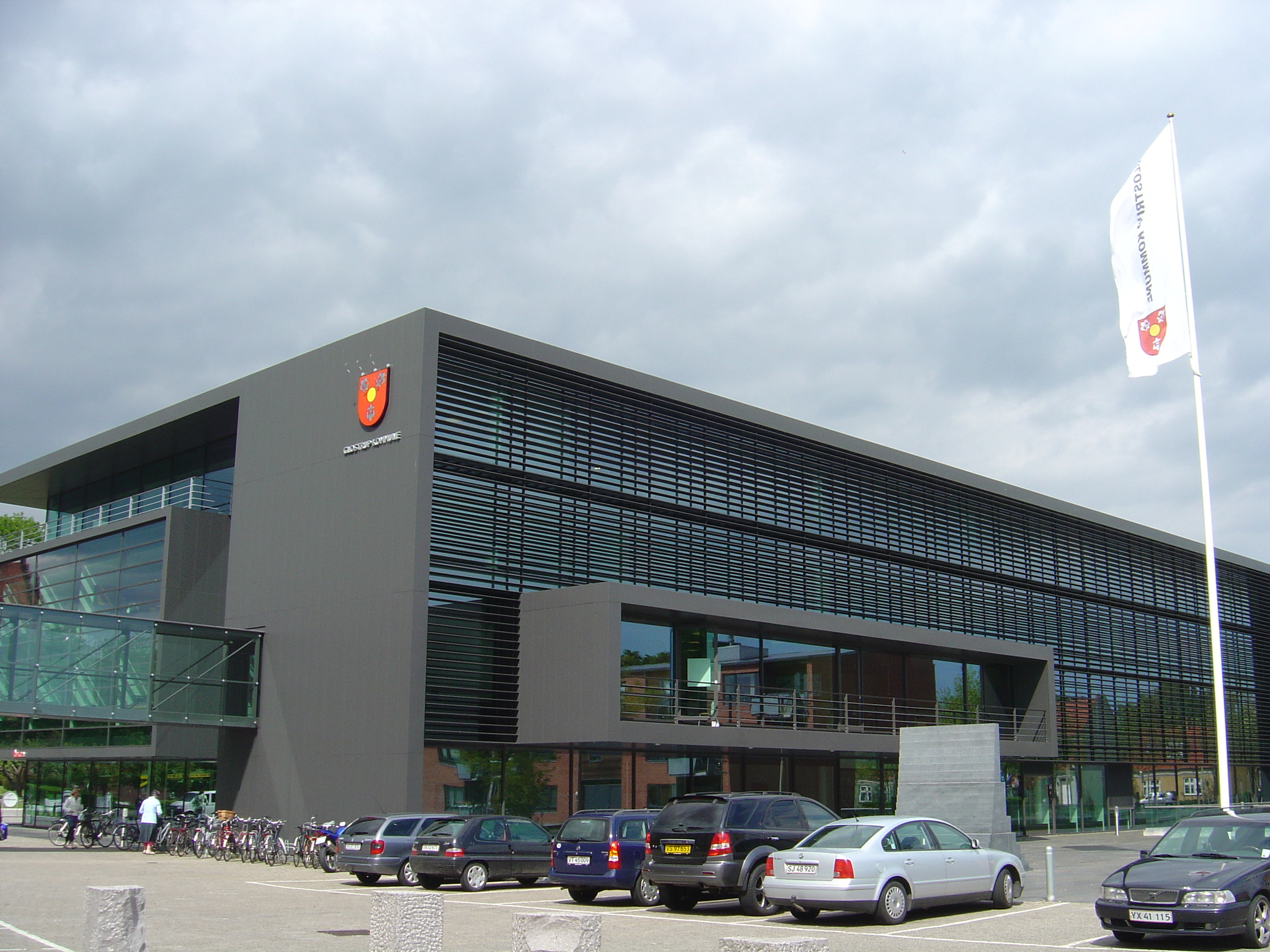
Glostrup Town Hall

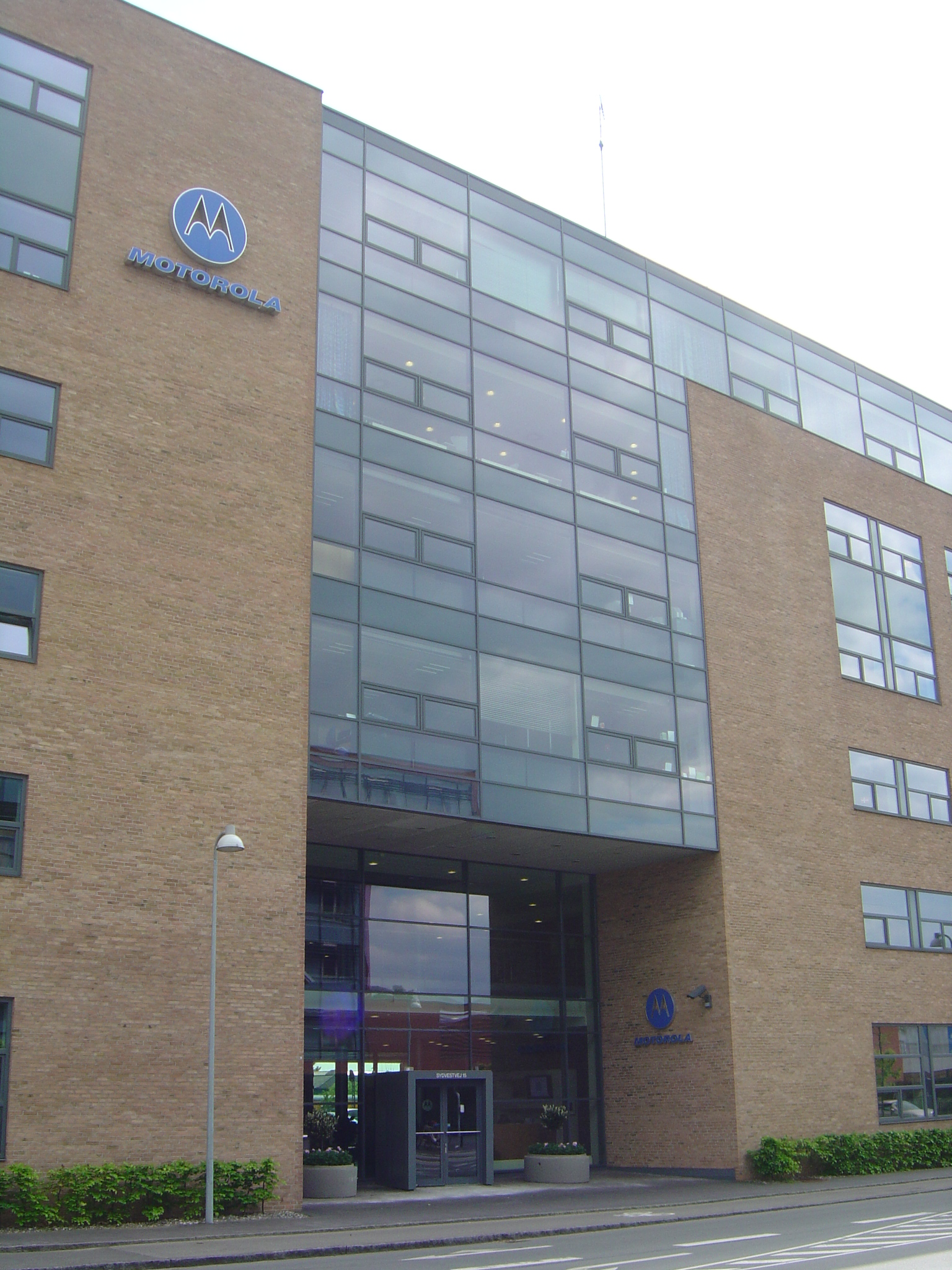
Motorola's Danish Headquarters in central Glostrup

During the 20th century Glostrup developed from a small railroad town into a modern middle class suburb. The population reached a peak during the 1970s flight from central Copenhagen, but has since stabilized. While most of Copenhagens western suburbs are dominated by public housing projects, Glostrups mix is around the Danish average. A series of large companies, e.g. Grontmij's and Motorola's Danish sections, along with NKT Holding and Pandora are situated in the area. Along with the surrounding municipalities, it forms the center of Copenhagen's productive industry. Glostrup Municipality has a total of 21,200 jobs in the private and public sectors combined.

Glostrup is also home to a series of public offices and institutions, e.g. Københavns Vestegn Police Departement and Glostrup Court, covering the western and northern suburbs of Copenhagen. Glostrup Hospital was inaugurated in 1958 and employs 3,200 people.

== History ==
=== Early history ===
The village of Glostrup was established some time between 1000 and 1197 and is named after its founder Glob. The village is first mentioned between 1186 and 1197 as Glostorp, but Glostrup church is from around 1150, indicating that a well-established community was already found at the site at this point. Most of the privately owned land came under Roskilde Cathedral over the next couple of centuries but was confiscated by the Crown after the Reformation in 1536.

Sources from 1682 indicate that the soil in the area was quite fertile as the village consisted of eight farms and 13 houses. Most of the smallholders worked for the farmers.

In 1773, when the new Roskilde Road was constructed between Copenhagen and Roskilde was constructed, it became the main road of the area.

=== 19th century ===
In 1847, Glostrup station opened as one of the original intermediate stations on the new railway line from Copenhagen to Roskilde, Denmark's first. Glostrup changed character and the population grew significantly during the last decades of the century. A poorhouse was established in 1862 and it was followed by a pharmacy in 1864, a new school in 1876 and telephone connection in 1886.

=== 20th century ===
An increasing number of industrial enterprises also established in the area. Lever Brothers opened a soap factory in 1924. In 1958, Glostrup Hospital opened in the northern part of the town.

== Housing ==
Glostrup Housing Association was founded in 1943 as a part of the expansion of the Danish capital and as an answer to the growing housing demand in general. The growing population combined with the already miserable living conditions in the central city led to a series of national plans to expand the number of housing units. While the supporters of the Glostrup Housing Association, predominantly Social Democrats, stressed the need to maintain local control of the expansion plans, opponents criticised the building of public housing in the municipality. The largest project of the association was the building of 1,200 housing units in relation to the building of Glostrup Hospital. They were built between 1956 and 1965, ultimately defining Glostrup as a suburb rather than a village. Other large plans included the erection of Avedøre Stationsby (Transferred to Hvidovre Municipality in 1974) and the Hvissinge Plan.

== Transport ==
=== Rail ===
Transport in Glostrup has historically been dominated by Glostrup railway station which opened on in 1847 on the railway line from Copenhagen to Roskilde, the first Danish railway line. While the railroad originally had just a halt in Glostrup, a station was built in 1918 to serve the local economy. It was designed by the architect Heinrich Wenck. In 1953, Copenhagen's S-train network was expanded to Glostrup.

=== Road ===
During the expansion of the motorways around Copenhagen in the port-war period Glostrup became a central node in the new transport geography of the larger Copenhagen area.

== Notable people ==
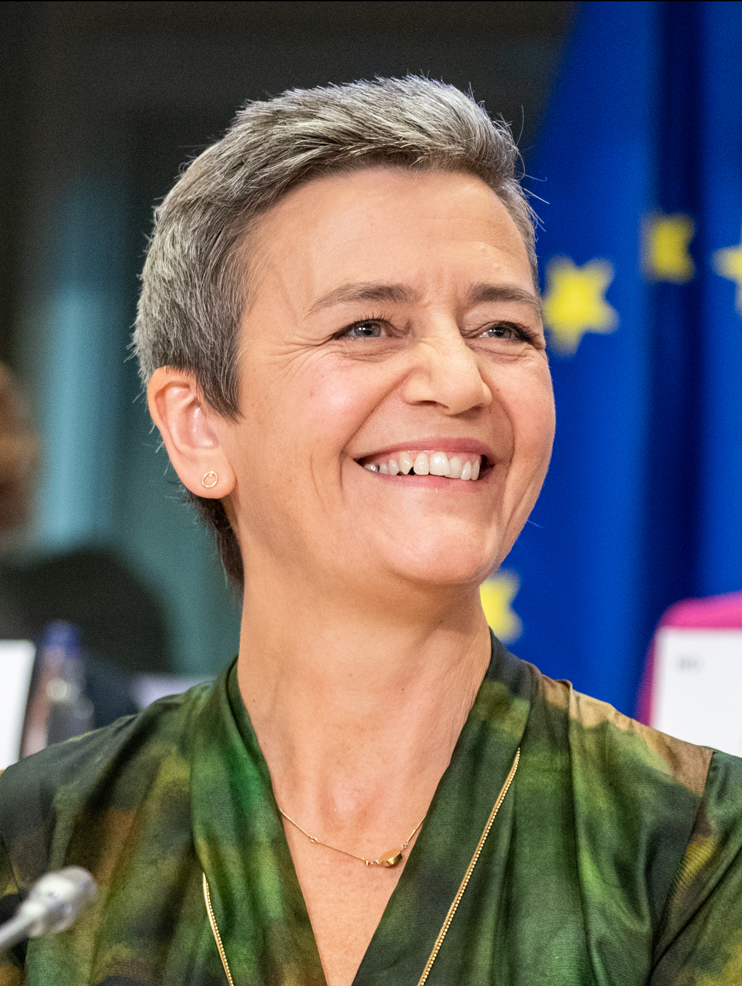
Margrethe Vestager, 2019

- Niels Simonsen Glostrup (died 1639), priest, the seventh Lutheran Bishop of Oslo
- Just Michael Aagaard (1757–1819), merchant and konditori-owner
- Holger Marius Nielsen (1905–1993) official of the Danish Ministry of Education.
- Preben Uglebjerg (1931–1968), actor and entertainer
- Jørgen Erik Nielsen (1933–2006) associate professor at the University of Copenhagen
- Eva Steiness (born 1941), physician, former university professor, now CEO of Serodus
- Werner Knudsen (born 1953), computer scientist, composer and IT books writer, lives here
- Søren Bundgaard (born 1956), singer
- Dicte (born 1966), musician and songwriter
- Svend Olling (born 1967), diplomat, Danish Ambassador to Turkey and Azerbaijan since 2016
- Nicolaj Kopernikus (born 1967), actor
- Margrethe Vestager (born 1968), politician, European Commissioner for Competition since 2014
- Amin Jensen (born 1970), actor, comedian and TV host
- Anita Lerche (born 1973), singer-songwriter, composer and actress
- Christina Liljenberg Halstrøm (born 1977), architect and furniture designer

=== Sport ===
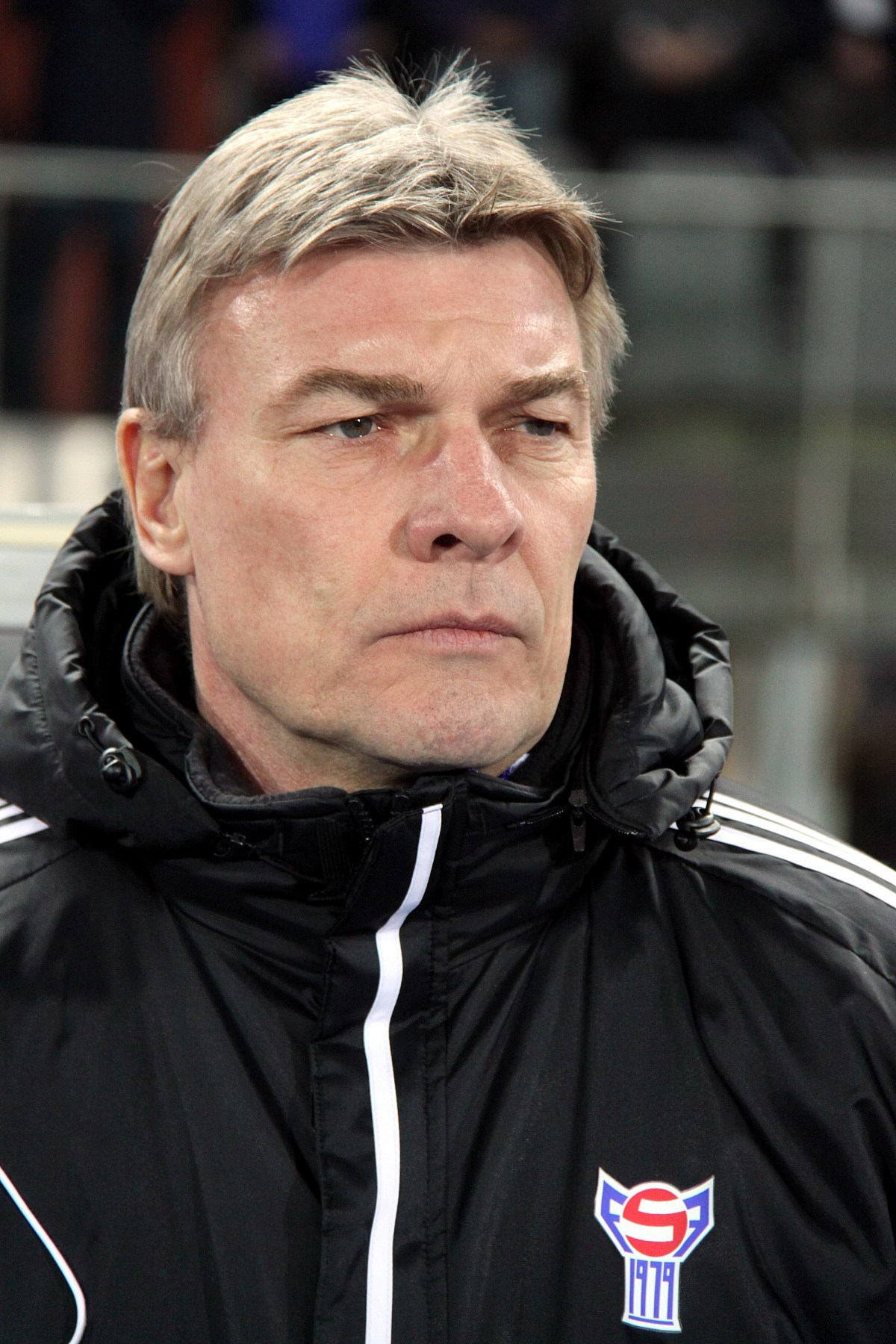
Lars Olsen, 2013

- Mogens Frey (born 1941), cyclist, Olympic winner
- Tom Køhlert (born 1947), football player and manager
- Søren Busk (born 1953), footballer
- Hans Kjeld Rasmussen (born 1954), sports shooter, Olympic winner
- Jan Sørensen (1955-2024), footballer
- Lars Olsen (born 1961), football player and manager
- Claus Christiansen (born 1967), footballer
- Jens Eriksen (born 1969), badminton player, Olympic medalist
- René Henriksen (born 1969), footballer
- Morten Wieghorst (born 1971), football player and manager
- Ronnie Ekelund (born 1972), footballer
- Michael Johansen (born 1972), footballer
- Thomas Hansen (born 1976), cricketer
- Lasse Schøne (born 1986), footballer
- Madeleine Dupont (born 1987), curler
- Anita Madsen (born 1995), figure skater
- Chido Obi (born 2007), footballer
- Jamal Bhuyan (born 1990), Bangladeshi footballer

== See also ==
- Glostrup station
