= Jørgen Erik Nielsen =

University of Copenhagen associate professor (1933–2007)

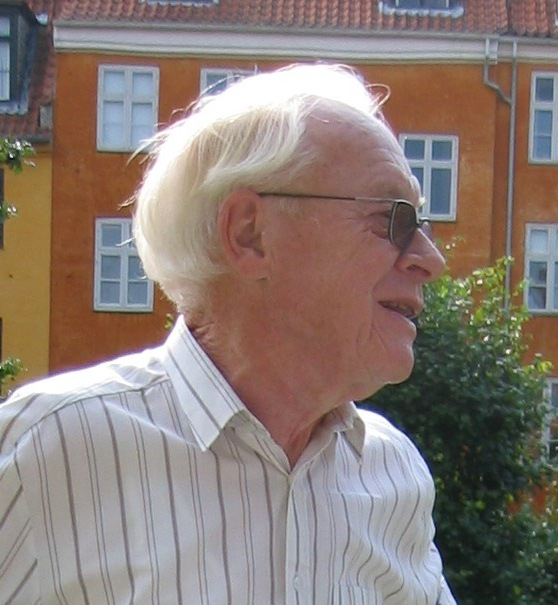
Jørgen Erik Nielsen, 2005

Jørgen Erik Nielsen, Dr. Phil. (23 September 1933 – 10 January 2007) was an associate professor at the University of Copenhagen.

Nielsen graduated from the University of Copenhagen in 1959. In 1976 he was awarded the D.Phil. degree for a dissertation on the Danish reception of contemporary English literature 1800–1840 (Den samtidige engelske litteratur og Danmark 1800–1840 I-II). He researched and published on the reception of English and Russian literature in Denmark in the 19th century. His research also resulted in a number of publications on Danish linguists of the 19th and 20th century. He contributed to A Linguist's Life, An English Translation of Otto Jespersen's Autobiography, by Arne Juul, Hans Frede Nielsen and Jørgen Erik Nielsen (ed.), Odense 1995, and published several articles and contributions on the work of Otto Jespersen. Furthermore, Nielsen researched and published on the work of Svend Rosing (1804–1884), who published a major Danish-English dictionary in 1853.

Jørgen Erik Nielsen retired in March 2002. After his retirement, he continued his research on the reception in Denmark of contemporary English and Russian writers. In 2006 he finished his contribution to Reception of Sir Walter Scott in Europe, by Murray Pittock (ed.), London 2007 and a comprehensive manuscript on the reception of Charles Dickens in Denmark, which is scheduled for publication in 2009.

He was an active member of the Danish Dickens Society and contributed with a number of articles in its journal "Our Mutual Friend".

Jørgen Erik Nielsen was the son of Holger Marius Nielsen (1905-1993) and Ellen Ingeborg Marie Nielsen (born Andersen) (1904-1983) and grew up in Glostrup, approximately 10 kilometres west of Copenhagen. In 1967 he married Irene Ishøy (born 23 November 1942). He is the father of three children, Henrik Karl Nielsen (born 9 August 1969), Anne Merete Nielsen (born 6 August 1972) and Anders Christian Nielsen (born 4 October 1975).

== Publication record ==
Jørgen Erik Nielsen is the author of several books and articles on the Danish reception of English and Russian literature and on the history English studies in Denmark. His publication record includes inter alia:

- Den engelske litteraturs dyrkere i Holsten omkring 1820. Et formildlende led mellem England og Danmark. (Studier fra Sprog- og Oldtidsforskning), Copenhagen 1966.
- Byron Apocrypha, Notes and Queries, 281, London 1973, pp. 291–292
- A literary miscellany: proceedings of the Otto Jespersen Symposium April 29–30, 1993, edited by Jørgen Erik Nielsen and Arne Zettersten 1994
- A Linguist's Life, An English Translation of Otto Jespersen's Autobiography, by Arne Juul, Hans Frede Nielsen and Jørgen Erik Nielsen (ed.), Odense 1995.
- Fra Neva til Øresund, Den danske modtagelse af russisk litteratur 1800-1856, by Jørgen Erik Nielsen, Copenhagen 1999
- “Look to the Baltic”: Byron between Romanticism and Radicalism in Denmark, The Reception of Byron in Europe, London 2005
- His pirates had foray'd on Scottish hill: Scott in Denmark with an Overview of his Reception in Norway and Sweden, by Jørgen Erik Nielsen in Reception of Sir Walter Scott in Europe, by Murray Pittock (ed.), London 2007.
- "Dickens i Danmark", Copenhagen 2009, ISBN 978-87-635-2594-7

== Sources and links ==
- Our Mutual Friend, Vol. 8, May 2007, pp. 26–27 (Vibeke Schrøder).
