= Nielsen (crater) =

Crater on the Moon

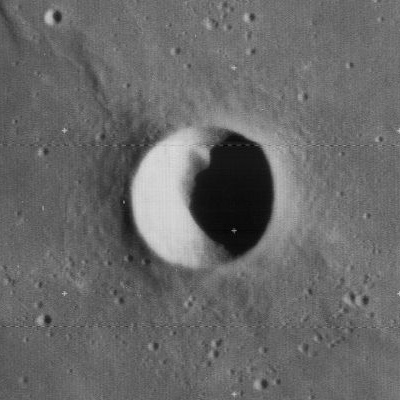
- Lunar Orbiter 4 image
- Coordinates: 31.80°N 51.76°W
- Diameter: 9.64 km (5.99 mi)
- Depth: Unknown
- Colongitude: 52° at sunrise
- Eponym: Axel V. Nielsen; Harald H. Nielsen

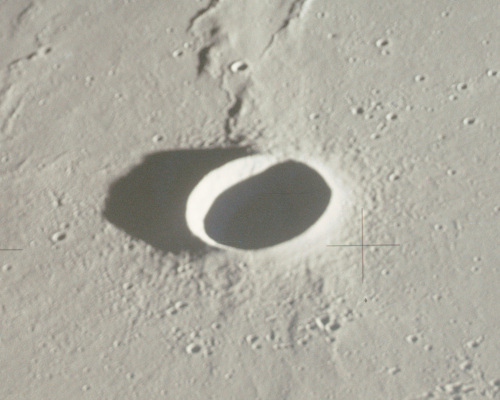
Oblique view from Apollo 15

Nielsen is a lunar impact crater on the Oceanus Procellarum. It is located north-east of Montes Agricola on the western hemisphere of the Moon. To the east-southeast is the crater Wollaston.

Nielsen is a bowl-shaped formation that lies astride a small ridge that runs north-northwestwards towards the Mons Rümker. The latter is an unusual raised formation of lunar domes.

In 1973, the crater was named jointly after the Danish astronomer Axel Nielsen (1902-1970) and the Danish–American physicist Harald Herborg Nielsen (1903-1973), by the IAU.
