= Pratappur, Raebareli =

Pratappur Partābpur
- Village
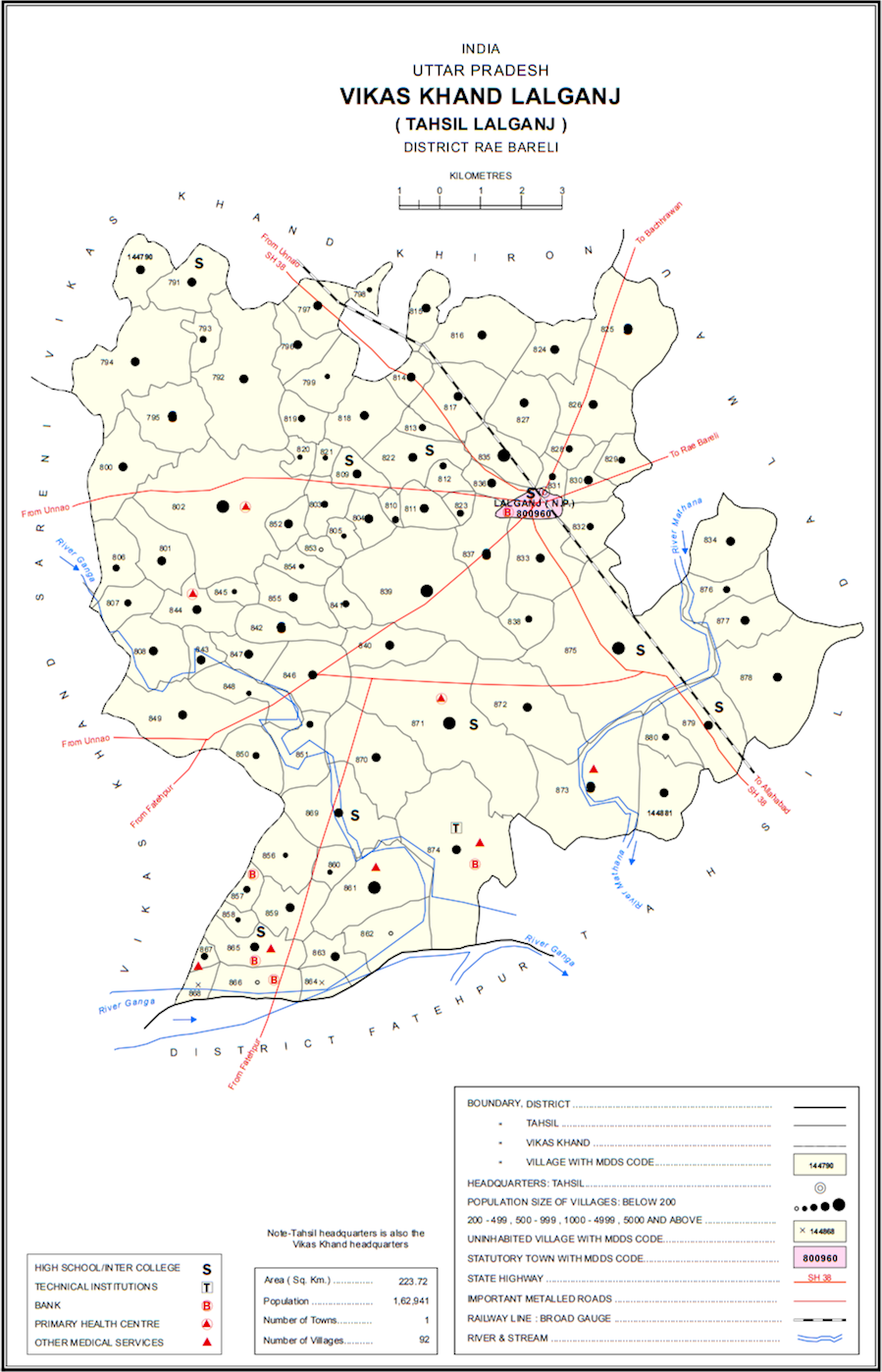
- Map showing Pratappur (#805) in Lalganj CD block

- Location in Uttar Pradesh, India
- Coordinates: 26.16318°N 80.92775°E
- Country: India
- State: Uttar Pradesh
- District: Raebareli

Area
  - Total: 0.535 km^{2} (0.207 sq mi)

Population (2011)
  - Total: 417
  - Density: 779/km^{2} (2,020/sq mi)

Languages
  - Official: Hindi
- Time zone: UTC+5:30 (IST)
- Vehicle registration: UP-35

Pratappur is a village in Lalganj block of Rae Bareli district, Uttar Pradesh, India. As of 2011, it has a population of 417 people, in 74 households. It has no schools and no healthcare facilities, and it does not host a permanent market or a weekly haat. It belongs to the nyaya panchayat of Behta Kalan.

The 1951 census recorded Pratappur (as "Partabpur") as comprising 1 hamlet, with a total population of 124 people (70 male and 54 female), in 28 households and 27 physical houses. The area of the village was given as 139 acres. 8 residents were literate, all male. The village was listed as belonging to the pargana of Sareni and the thana of Sareni.

The 1961 census recorded Pratappur as comprising 1 hamlet, with a total population of 158 people (111 male and 47 female), in 48 households and 47 physical houses. The area of the village was given as 139 acres.

The 1981 census recorded Pratappur as having a population of 268 people, in 40 households, and having an area of 55.04 hectares. The main staple foods were listed as wheat and rice.

The 1991 census recorded Pratappur as having a total population of 335 people (183 male and 152 female), in 55 households and 55 physical houses. The area of the village was listed as 57 hectares. Members of the 0-6 age group numbered 60, or 18% of the total; this group was 57% male (34) and 43% female (26). Members of scheduled castes made up 18% of the village's population, while no members of scheduled tribes were recorded. The literacy rate of the village was 44% (111 men and 36 women). 89 people were classified as main workers (all men), while 40 people were classified as marginal workers (1 man and 39 women); the remaining 206 residents were non-workers. The breakdown of main workers by employment category was as follows: 70 cultivators (i.e. people who owned or leased their own land); 6 agricultural labourers (i.e. people who worked someone else's land in return for payment); 0 workers in livestock, forestry, fishing, hunting, plantations, orchards, etc.; 0 in mining and quarrying; 0 household industry workers; 0 workers employed in other manufacturing, processing, service, and repair roles; 1 construction worker; 1 employed in trade and commerce; 0 employed in transport, storage, and communications; and 11 in other services.
