= Wollaston (crater) =

Crater on the Moon

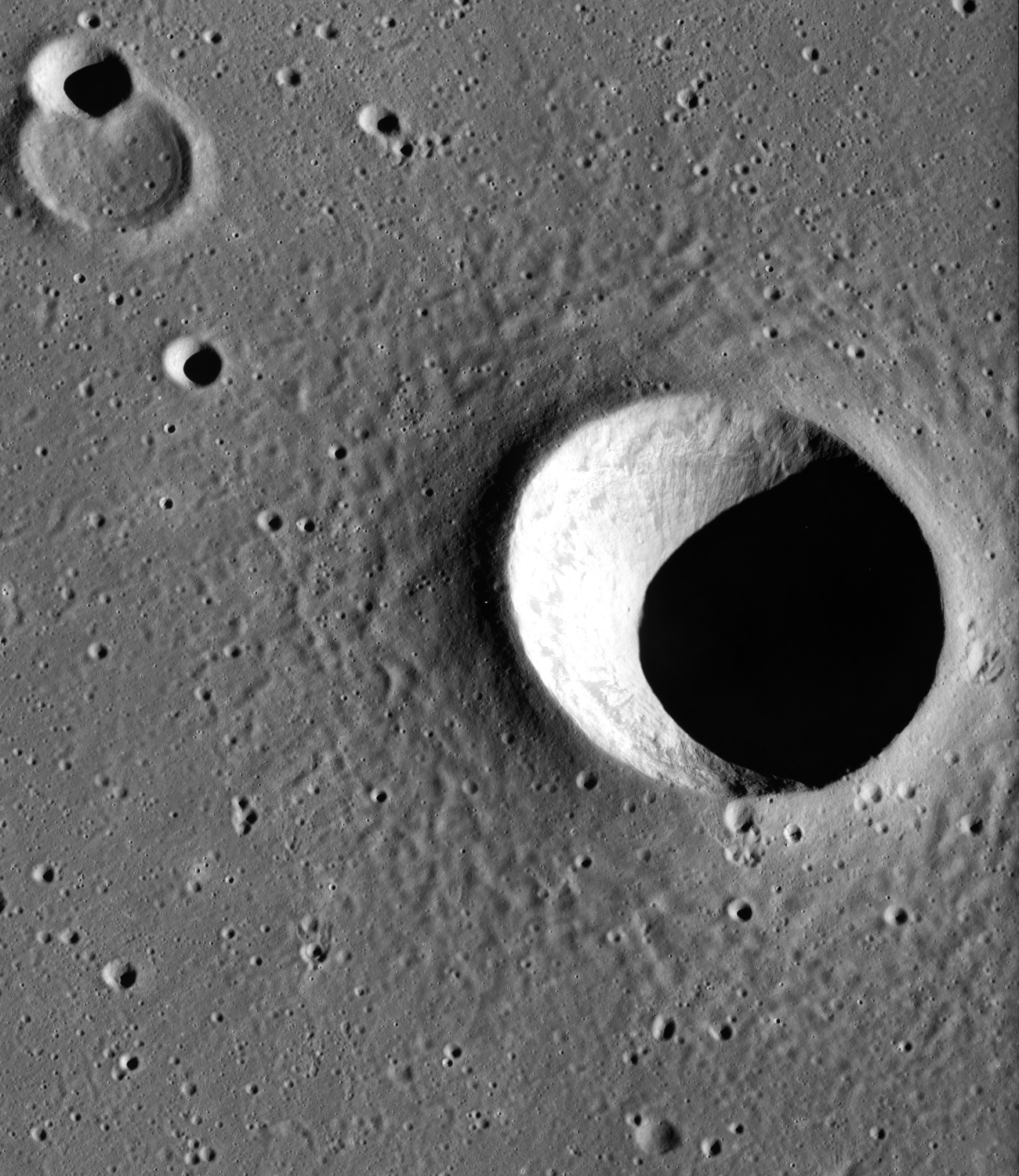
- Oblique Apollo 15 image
- Coordinates: 30.60°N 46.98°W
- Diameter: 9.64 km (5.99 mi)
- Depth: 2.22 km
- Colongitude: 47° at sunrise
- Eponym: William H. Wollaston

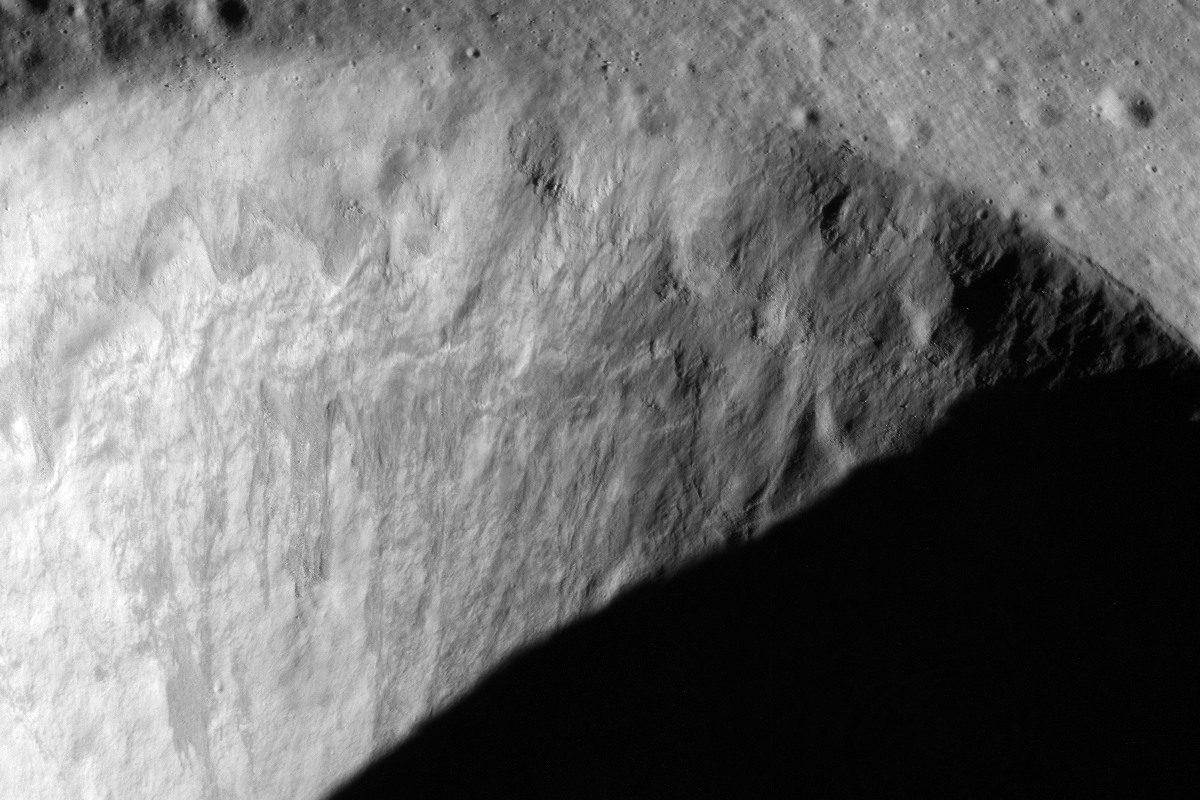
Detail of the above image

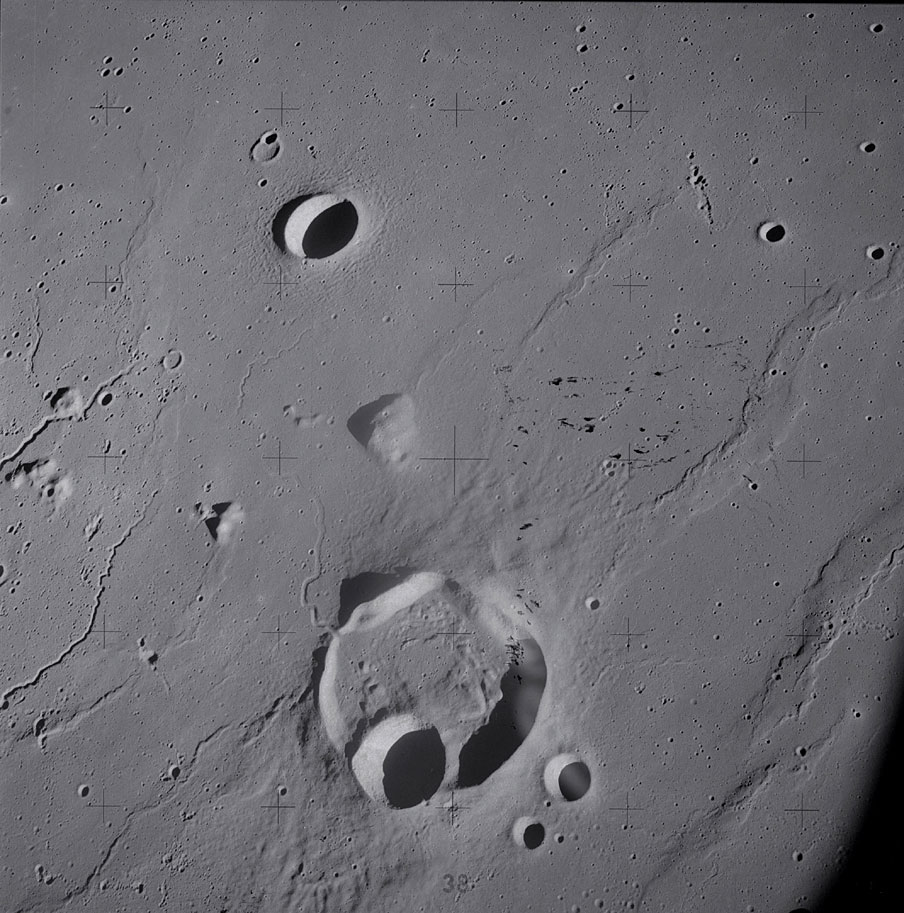
Wollaston (upper left) and Krieger (bottom) from Apollo 15. NASA photo.

Wollaston is a relatively small lunar impact crater located in the Oceanus Procellarum. To the northwest is the similar Nielsen. To the southeast is the somewhat larger Krieger. There are several small rilles to the southwest of Wollaston, forming part of the Rimae Prinz.

The crater was formally named by the IAU in 1935.

This is a circular, cup-shaped crater with a higher albedo than the surrounding mare. It has a raised rim that is free from impact erosion, and is surrounded by a small radial skirt of ejecta. The crater has not been significantly eroded by subsequent impacts.

== Satellite craters ==
By convention these features are identified on lunar maps by placing the letter on the side of the crater midpoint that is closest to Wollaston.

Wollaston	Latitude	Longitude	Diameter
D	33.1° N	48.7° W	5 km
N	28.3° N	48.1° W	6 km
P	29.3° N	49.9° W	5 km
R	29.5° N	50.8° W	6 km
U	31.0° N	52.9° W	3 km
V	30.9° N	54.0° W	4 km

The following craters have been renamed by the IAU.

- Wollaston C — See Nielsen.
