= Heer from Denmark =

Studio album by Anita Lerche
- Released: 21 November 2006
- Genres: Classical, Punjabi folk, Bhangra
- Length: 44:00
- Label: Goyal Music (Bathinda)

Heer from Denmark is the first Punjabi solo album by Anita Lerche, a singer-songwriter from Denmark.

Throughout this album, the singer pays tribute to the rich Punjabi culture. The album is a mixture of traditional Punjabi folk, Bhangra (Punjabi pop), and Western music.

Lerche has been sung in 16 different languages of the world till now.

== Track listing ==
The album has nine tracks. One of them is the legendary Punjabi folk song "Heer" written by Waris Shah, sung using the traditional folk tune. The album also includes an English song "Goddess" written and composed by Lerche herself.

Heer from Denmark track listing
| No. | Title | Lyrics | Music | Length |
|---|---|---|---|---|
| 1. | "Gori" | | | 4:12 |
| 2. | "Mallomalli" | | | 3:57 |
| 3. | "Koka" | | | 4:39 |
| 4. | "Nacha Lai" | | | 4:05 |
| 5. | "Passport" (Duet with G.P. Bali) | Chann Gurayan Wala | | 4:32 |
| 6. | "Mela" | | | 4:48 |
| 7. | "Heer" (Traditional composition) | Waris Shah | | 6:30 |
| 8. | "Classic remix" | Mix | | 4:42 |
| 9. | "Goddess" | Anita Lerche | Anita Lerche | 4:36 |
| Total length: | | | | 44:00 |

The tracks Passport and Gori were played on the BBC Asian Network on 27 June 2010 in a programme co-hosted by Lerche herself.
