= Svend Olling =

Danish diplomat

His Excellency Svend Olling
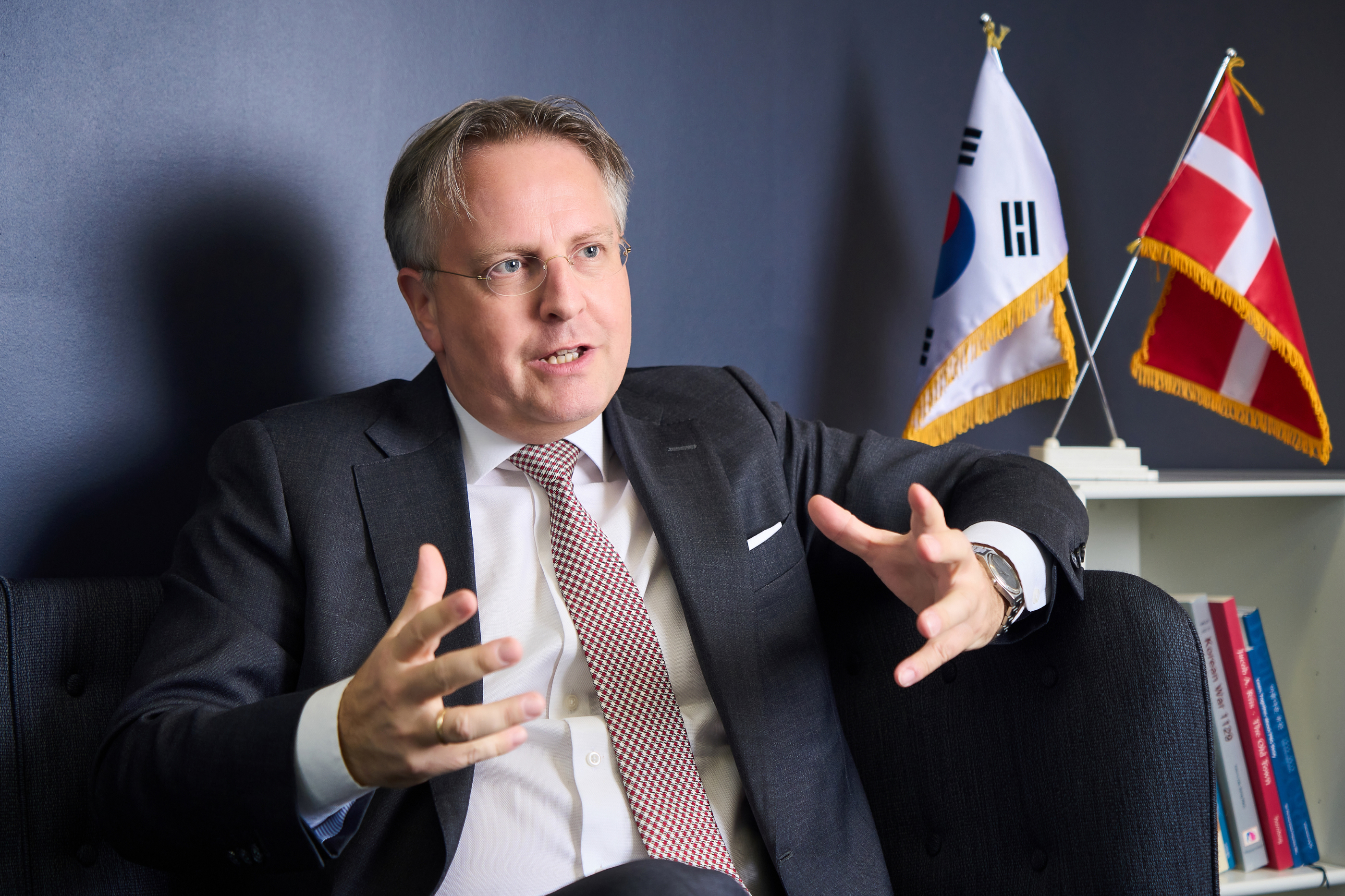
- Born: 9 November 1967 (age 58); Glostrup, Denmark
- Education: Haderslev Katedralskole Danmarks Tekniske Universitet Københavns Universitet Haderslev Realskole HSCHS John F. Kennedy School of Government
- Occupation: Former ambassador of Denmark to Korea
- Children: Asbjørn Kjær Olling (1997); Astrid Kjær Olling (1999); Ingrid Kjær Olling (2004)

Svend Olling (born 9 November 1967 in Glostrup) is a Danish diplomat.

Svend Olling graduated from the University of Copenhagen in 1994 with a Master of Science in economics. He has served in the embassies in Washington, D.C., United States and in Berlin, Germany. From 2010 to 2013, he was the Danish Ambassador in Dhaka, Bangladesh, from September 2016 to 2020 the Danish Ambassador in Ankara, Turkey and Azerbaijan. From 2020 to 2023, he was the Danish Ambassador to Egypt, and latest the Danish Ambassador to Korea from March 2023 to April 2025. In the Danish Foreign Ministry, Svend Olling has primarily worked with European Affairs, Security Policy, Export Promotion and IT. He was also involved in hosting the Copenhagen Climate Change Conference COP15 in 2009.

Svend Olling is married to Duygu Toker Olling and together with his former partner, Ann Kjær, has three children: Asbjørn (1997), Astrid (1999) and Ingrid Kjær Olling (2004).

Svend Olling was appointed Knight of the Order of the Dannebrog in 2008.

== Publications ==
- "Ambassadørens krystalkugle: 2016 var ikke et godt år for Tyrkiet", Jyllands-Posten. 5 January 2017.
- "Tragedien i Savar", Altinget.dk. 13 May 2013.
