= Shahpur, Lalganj =

Shahpur Shāhpur
- Village
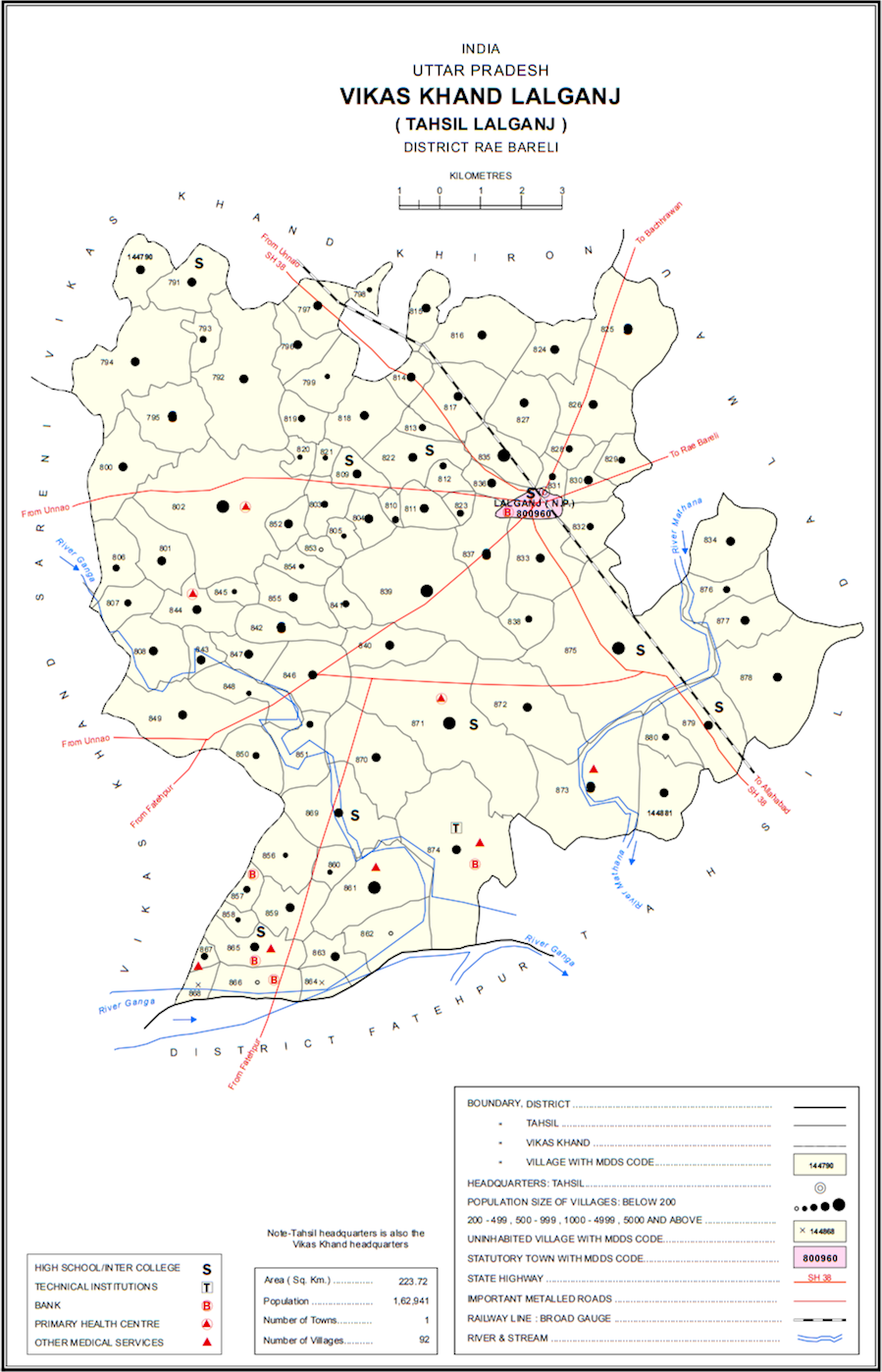
- Map showing Shahpur (#803) in Lalganj CD block

- Location in Uttar Pradesh, India
- Coordinates: 26.169386°N 80.923691°E
- Country: India
- State: Uttar Pradesh
- District: Raebareli

Area
  - Total: 1.418 km^{2} (0.547 sq mi)

Population (2011)
  - Total: 689
  - Density: 486/km^{2} (1,260/sq mi)

Languages
  - Official: Hindi
- Time zone: UTC+5:30 (IST)
- Vehicle registration: UP-33

Shahpur is a village in Lalganj block of Rae Bareli district, Uttar Pradesh, India. It is located 8 km from Lalganj, the block and tehsil headquarters. As of 2011, it has a population of 689 people, in 126 households. It has 1 primary school and no healthcare facilities, and it hosts both a permanent market and a weekly haat. It belongs to the nyaya panchayat of Behta Kalan.

The 1951 census recorded Shahpur as comprising 4 hamlets, with a total population of 260 people (149 male and 111 female), in 58 households and 44 physical houses. The area of the village was given as 340 acres. 45 residents were literate, 41 male and 5 female. The village was listed as belonging to the pargana of Sareni and the thana of Sareni.

The 1961 census recorded Shahpur as comprising 1 hamlet, with a total population of 324 people (168 male and 156 female), in 65 households and 54 physical houses. The area of the village was given as 340 acres and it had a medical practitioner at that point.

The 1981 census recorded Shahpur as having a population of 449 people, in 83 households, and having an area of 141.64 hectares. The main staple foods were listed as wheat and rice.

The 1991 census recorded Shahpur as having a total population of 482 people (258 male and 224 female), in 62 households and 62 physical houses. The area of the village was listed as 142 hectares. Members of the 0-6 age group numbered 73, or 15% of the total; this group was 58% male (42) and 42% female (31). Members of scheduled castes made up 11% of the village's population, while no members of scheduled tribes were recorded. The literacy rate of the village was 39% (130 men and 59 women). 183 people were classified as main workers (155 men and 28 women), while 0 people were classified as marginal workers; the remaining 299 residents were non-workers. The breakdown of main workers by employment category was as follows: 111 cultivators (i.e. people who owned or leased their own land); 56 agricultural labourers (i.e. people who worked someone else's land in return for payment); 0 workers in livestock, forestry, fishing, hunting, plantations, orchards, etc.; 0 in mining and quarrying; 10 household industry workers; 4 workers employed in other manufacturing, processing, service, and repair roles; 0 construction workers; 4 employed in trade and commerce; 0 employed in transport, storage, and communications; and 28 in other services.
