= Ole Rømer Observatory =

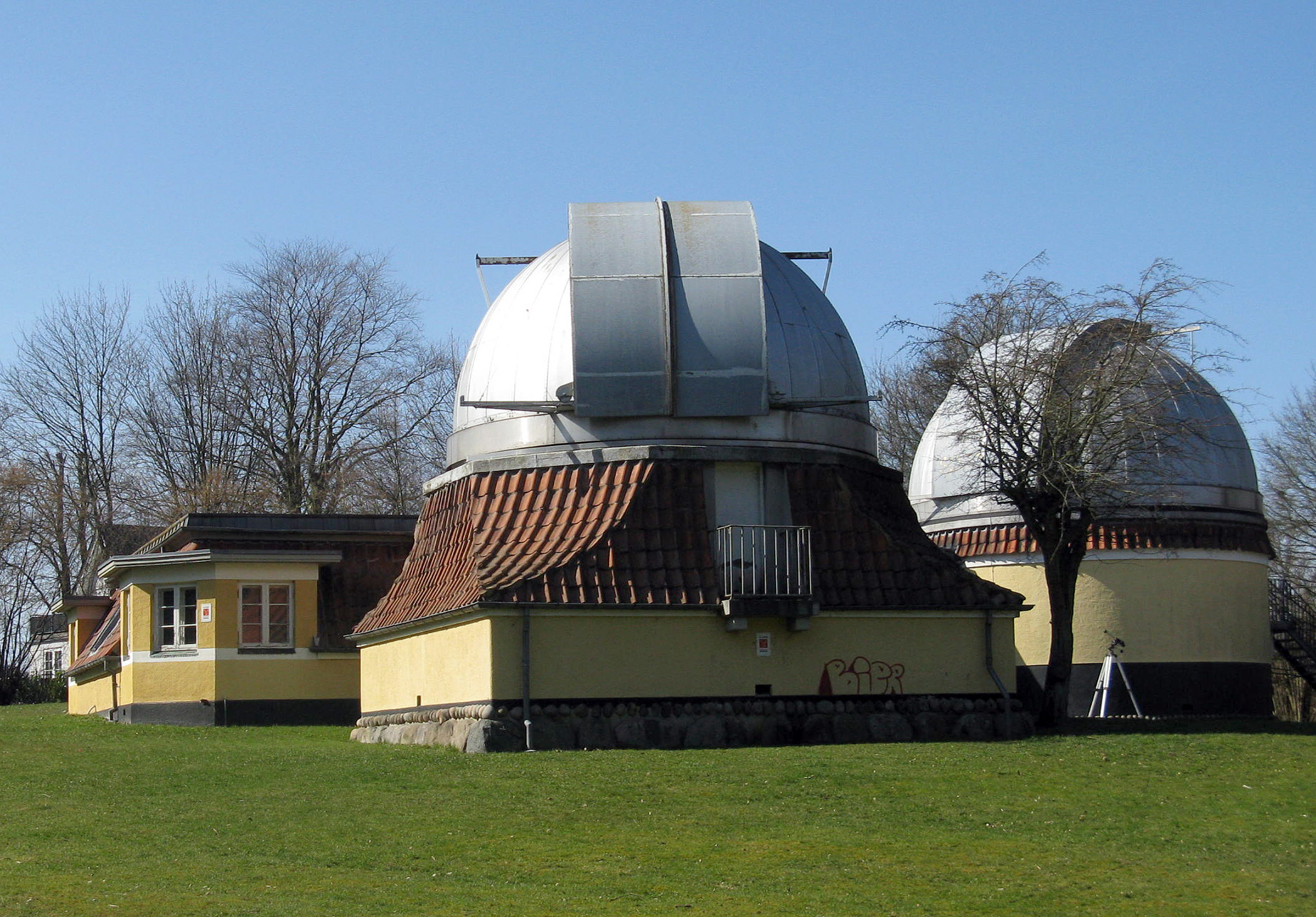
- Ole Rømer Observatoriet
- Named after: Ole Rømer
- Organization: Aarhus University
- Observatory code: 155
- Location: Aarhus, Denmark
- Coordinates: 56.128069°N 10.193223°E
- Established: 15 October 1911
- Website: Ole Rømer Observatory

Telescopes
- Cassegrain: 50 cm reflector
- Schmidt-Cassegrain: 28 cm reflector
- Schmidt-Cassegrain: 28 cm reflector
- Schmidt–Cassegrain: 20 cm reflector
- Related media on Commons

Ole Rømer Observatory (Danish: Ole Rømer Observatoriet) is an astronomical observatory and museum, built in 1911 and located in Aarhus, Denmark. It is operated by Aarhus University and functions both as a research and training laboratory for the university Institute for Physics and Astronomy and a museum offering guided tours and lectures. It is named after astronomer Ole Rømer, and the buildings were listed in 2006 as a fine example of Danish Art Nouveau architecture (Danish: Skønvirke). The facility also includes a residential house, originally and formerly home to the director of the observatory, today used as a guest house for visiting researchers.

The observatory facilitates education, public outreach and research as part of an original agreement when it was built. The observatory offers presentations and discussions on a broad array of astronomical topics on selected evenings and when the sky is clear the observatory's two 11-inch Schmidt-Cassegrain telescopes are employed.

== History ==
In September 1908 Victor Nielsen, an astronomer at the Uraniborg observatory, contacted the city council of Aarhus and informed them that the German astronomer Friedrich Krüger from Altenburg in Thuringia would move to Aarhus with his instruments in exchange for a parcel of land. Krüger sent an application on 4 December describing his previous work, publications and instruments and a suggestion for a deal contingent on 3 conditions:

- The city of Aarhus had to build the observatory
- Krüger would donate all his instruments to the city
- The observatory should be in the service of education

The city council discussed the matter on 25 February 1909 with a positive outcome and on 3 June it was decided to build the observatory and accept the 3 conditions.

It took two years from the initial agreement until the buildings stood finished. Designed by architect Anton Rosen, the Ole Rømer Observatory was inaugurated on 15 October 1911. Krüger worked as director until his death on 6 January 1916, followed by Ruben Andersen until he died on 30 April 1955. The observatory was handed over to Aarhus University on 1 September 1956 and on 1 April of the same year, dr. Mogens Rudkjøbing became professor of Astronomy at Aarhus University and new director for the observatory. The current telescopes were installed in the 1950s. In 1974, the Institute for Astronomy moved into the university campus in the same building as the Institute for Physics, and in 1990 the departments merged to form the Institute for Physics and Astronomy. Between 1981 and 1994, Krügers former residence became a museum.

The Ole Rømer Observatory was listed in January 2006 by the Danish Heritage Agency, almost 100 years after it was completed in 1911. The reasons cited was the uniqueness of the architecture which unites the arts and crafts movement of the time with a functionalist impression and that it was designed by Anton Rosen, a prolific 20th-century Danish architect.

=== Friedrich Krüger ===
During the construction phase of the observatory there was a heated debate in newspapers, among others Århus Stiftstidende, regarding Friedrich Krügers intentions. The Second Schleswig War and the loss of Schleswing-Holstein in 1864 was still recent memory so Germans was viewed with suspicion. Krügers heritage was an issue until his death in 1916.

Krüger was frequently accused of being a spy which became more of an issue after his son joined the German army during World War I. Various theories emerged; it was thought the telescopes could be used to observe shipping in the Bay of Aarhus, that there were radio transmitters used to send information to Germany, that the telescopes could be used to send morse code to German war ships and that the foundation under the telescopes were actually meant for cannons. The police and military took the rumours seriously enough to surveil and search the observatory, but it was subsequently concluded that Krüger was not a spy. The tense atmosphere took a heavy toll on Krüger.

== Buildings ==
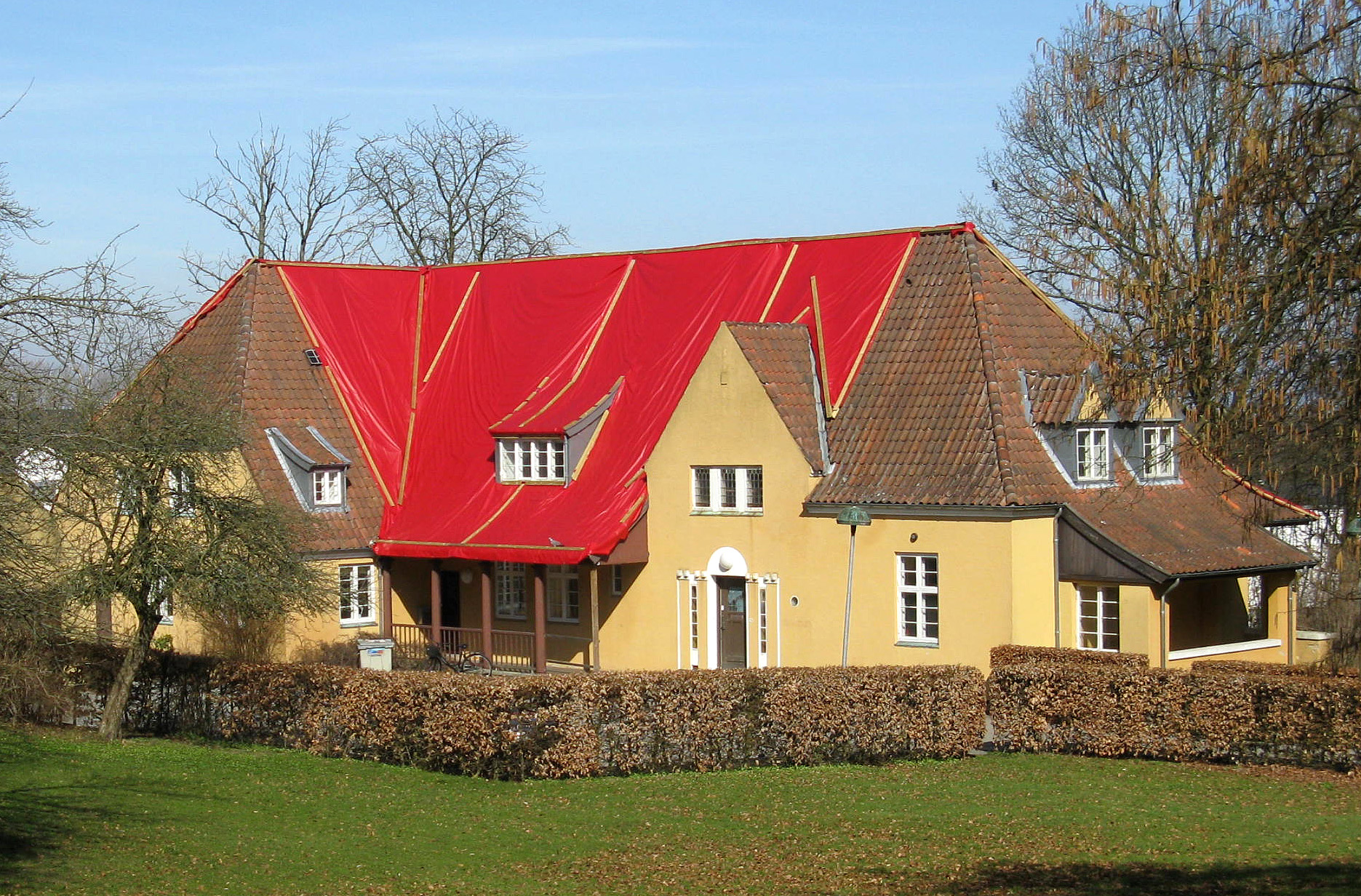
Directors residence under renovation.

The Ole Rømer Observatory consists of the observatory building and the anxillary directors residence including a small outbuilding, all designed by Anton Rosen. Construction began in 1909 and was completed in 1911. The observatory is placed on a small hill close to Aarhus Racecourse and the Marselisborg Palace in Højbjerg in the south-eastern outskirts of Aarhus city. At the time of construction, it was undisturbed by the lights from the city, making observations a bit easier than nowadays.

The observatory building consists of a central house with a hall, office, workshop and classroom and two rotating cupolas for telescopes adjoining its sides. The hall is equipped with Greek inspired columns and decorative details in the form of reliefs and carpentry. The entire building is oriented according to the four corners of the world, with the movable zink clad observing cupolas north and east of the central room. The basement holds a darkroom and timing equipment. The outside architecture displays the arts and crafts style with a base of fieldstone in two sizes, low plastered walls and a tiled mansard-like roof.

The large directors residence, situated north of the observatory itself, has an irregular appearance, featuring a front dormer, both hipped and half-hipped roofs, side dormers oriel and porch. The building is plastered and has a characteristic tiled roof. The original overall room structure has been preserved, although some changes was made, when it was turned into a guest house in 2012. There are four apartments in all, named after the astronomers Aristotle, Brahe, Kopernikus and Kepler.

== Telescopes ==
The cupolas previously held a 40 cm. and a 50 cm. Cassegrain telescope but in 2004 they were replaced with two 28 cm Celestron Schmidt-Cassegrain telescopes. In 2013 the 50 cm. telescope was renovated and put back into use.

== See also ==
- List of astronomical observatories
