= Shahpur, Huzur =

Shahpur
- village
- Location within Madhya Pradesh Location within India
- Coordinates: 23.40323752°N 77.34645367°E
- Country: India
- State: Madhya Pradesh
- District: Bhopal
- Tehsil: Huzur
- Elevation: 496 m (1,627 ft)

Population (2011)
  - Total: 1,086
- Time zone: UTC+5:30 (IST)
- ISO 3166 code: MP-IN
- 2011 census code: 482381

Shahpur is a village in the Bhopal district of Madhya Pradesh, India. It is located in the Huzur tehsil and the Phanda block.

== Demographics ==
According to the 2011 census of India, Shahpur has 230 households. The effective literacy rate (i.e. the literacy rate of population excluding children aged 6 and below) is 67.71%.

Demographics (2011 Census)
| | Total | Male | Female |
|---|---|---|---|
| Population | 1086 | 549 | 537 |
| Children aged below 6 years | 163 | 73 | 90 |
| Scheduled caste | 219 | 109 | 110 |
| Scheduled tribe | 13 | 7 | 6 |
| Literates | 625 | 371 | 254 |
| Workers (all) | 407 | 283 | 124 |
| Main workers (total) | 222 | 210 | 12 |
| Main workers: Cultivators | 125 | 119 | 6 |
| Main workers: Agricultural labourers | 83 | 79 | 4 |
| Main workers: Household industry workers | 1 | 1 | 0 |
| Main workers: Other | 13 | 11 | 2 |
| Marginal workers (total) | 185 | 73 | 112 |
| Marginal workers: Cultivators | 5 | 2 | 3 |
| Marginal workers: Agricultural labourers | 177 | 69 | 108 |
| Marginal workers: Household industry workers | 0 | 0 | 0 |
| Marginal workers: Others | 3 | 2 | 1 |
| Non-workers | 679 | 266 | 413 |
