= Shahpur Dogran =

- Village
- Location in Punjab, India Shahpur Dogran (India)
- Coordinates: 31.327091°N 75.300401°E
- Country: India
- State: Punjab
- District: Kapurthala

Government
  - Type: Panchayati raj (India)
  - Body: Gram panchayat

Population (2011)
  - Total: 117
- Sex ratio 58/59♂/♀

Languages
  - Official: Punjabi
  - Other spoken: Hindi
- Time zone: UTC+5:30 (IST)
- PIN: 144628
- Telephone code: 01822
- ISO 3166 code: IN-PB
- Vehicle registration: PB-09
- Website: kapurthala.gov.in

Shahpur Dogran is a village in Kapurthala district of Punjab State, India. It is located 12 kilometres (7.5 mi) from Kapurthala, which is both district and sub-district headquarters of Shahpur Dogran. The village is administrated by a Sarpanch who is an elected representative.

== Transport ==
Kapurthala Rail Way Station, Rail Coach Fact Rail Way Station are the nearby railway stations. Jalandhar City Rail Way station is 23 km away from the village. The village is 73 km away from Sri Guru Ram Dass Jee International Airport in Amritsar. Another nearby airport is Sahnewal Airport in Ludhiana which is located 77 km away from the village.
