= Chris Liljenberg Halstrøm =

Danish architect and designer (born 1977)

Chris Liljenberg Halstrøm (born 1977) is a Danish furniture designer and artist. The daughter of a Swedish mother and a Danish father, she studied art and design in both Stockholm, Berlin and in Copenhagen at the Royal Danish Academy, graduating in 2007. She specializes in furniture design and textile art.

Based in both Copenhagen, Denmark and Småland, Sweden Halstrøm's designs reflect the lightness of form typical of Scandinavian minimalism. Like most of her furniture, her four-legged George Stool, named after her eldest son, is tinted in hues of charcoal grey and natural wood. Made of oak with a grey woolen cushion, it is carefully crafted with a cushion extending slightly over the seat.
