= Journal of Molecular Spectroscopy =

- Language: English
- Edited by: Michael Heaven

Publication details
- History: 1957 - present
- Frequency: Monthly
- Impact factor: 1.507 (2020)

Standard abbreviations
- ISO 4: J. Mol. Spectrosc.

Indexing
- CODEN: PLDIDE
- ISSN: 1096-083X
- OCLC no.: 36945731

Links
- Journal homepage; Online access

Journal of Molecular Spectroscopy is a peer-reviewed scientific journal that deals with experimental and theoretical articles on all subjects relevant to molecular spectroscopy and its modern applications.

== Indexing and abstracting ==
According to the Journal Citation Reports, the journal has a 2020 impact factor of 1.507. The journal in indexing in the following bibliographic databases:

- AGRICOLA
- Chemical Abstracts
- Current Contents/Physics, Chemical, & Earth Sciences
- Research Alert
- Science Abstracts
- Science Citation Index
- Biological Abstracts
- Scopus
