= Shabad =

Shabad may refer to:

- Shabad (hymn) or Shabda, term meaning word in Sanskrit
- Shabad, Telangana, a town in India
- Shabd (film), 2005 Indian film
- Zemach Shabad (1864–1935), Lithuanian Jewish doctor and political activist

== See also ==
- Shahabad (disambiguation)
