= Shahpur Sirpura =

Coordinates: 28°43′17″N 78°30′27″E

Shahpur Sirpura is a village located 14 km north of Sambhal, Uttar Pradesh, India. It is situated in Sambhal taluk of Sambhal district. It lies to the southwest of Moradabad. Nearby settlements include Pakbara, Joya and Hasanpur. Moradabad and Amroha Railway Station and Indira Gandhi International Airport are the nearest railway station and airport, respectively.

It has a population of around 2,300, most of whom depend on agriculture. Some people left the village for their higher studies and other families settled in the NCR region.

== Economy ==
The primary occupation of the village is farming. Shahpur Sirpura is a marketplace for agricultural products such as fruits, sugarcane, and vegetables. While its economy is based on agriculture, many people of the village are working abroad, hence the economy of the village also depends on that.

== Climate ==
Shahpur Sirpura has a humid subtropical climate, with long, hot summers from early April to mid-September and brief mild winters. The monsoon season occurs in between. From March, the reversal in the direction of wind occurs, from the north-western direction to the south-western. The winds from Rajasthan carry sand and are called "Loo". Monsoon arrives at the end of June, bringing some respite, but increasing humidity. Winter starts in late November and peaks in January and is notorious for heavy fog. Temperatures range from −0.6 to 43.5 °C (30.9 to 110.3 °F). The annual mean temperature is 25 °C (77 °F). The average annual rainfall is approximately 720 millimetres (28 in), most of which is during the monsoons. The average date of the advent of monsoon winds in Shahpur Sirpura is 25 June.
