= Shahabad, Sirjan =

Shahabad شاه اباد
- Village
- Location within Iran
- Coordinates: 29°21′38″N 55°48′27″E
- Country: Iran
- Province: Kerman
- County: Sirjan
- Bakhsh: Central
- Rural District: Najafabad

Population (2006)
  - Total: 380
- Time zone: UTC+3:30 (IRST)
  - Summer (DST): UTC+4:30 (IRDT)

Shahabad (Persian: شاه اباد, also Romanized as Shāhābād; also known as Vaḩdatābād) is a village in Najafabad Rural District, in the Central District of Sirjan County, Kerman Province, Iran. At the 2006 census, its population was 380, in 85 families.
