= Shahabad, Lorestan =

Shahabad شاه اباد
- Village
- Location within Iran
- Coordinates: 33°49′53″N 48°15′30″E
- Country: Iran
- Province: Lorestan
- County: Selseleh
- Bakhsh: Central
- Rural District: Qaleh-ye Mozaffari

Population (2006)
  - Total: 89
- Time zone: UTC+3:30 (IRST)
  - Summer (DST): UTC+4:30 (IRDT)

Shahabad (Persian: شاه اباد, also Romanized as Shāhābād) is a village in Qaleh-ye Mozaffari Rural District, in the Central District of Selseleh County, Lorestan Province, Iran. At the 2006 census, its population was 89, in 18 families.
