= Shahapur, Bhandara =

Shahapur
- Census Town
- Shahapur Location in Bhandara Taluka
- Coordinates: 21.1552°N 79.5700°E
- Country: India
- State: Maharashtra
- Region: Vidharba
- District: Bhandara

Government
  - Type: Gram Panchayat
  - Body: Shahapur Grampanchayat

Languages
  - Official: Marathi
- Time zone: UTC+5:30 (IST)
- PIN: 441906
- Telephone code: +917184 ******
- Vehicle registration: MH-36
- Nearest city: Bhandara
- Lok Sabha constituency: Bhandara-Gondiya (Lok Sabha constituency)
- Vidhan Sabha constituency: Bhandara (Vidhan Sabha constituency)

Shahapur is a Census town in the Bhandara tahsil of Bhandara District of Maharashtra state in India. It is situated on the back of NH-6. the town speaks Marathi language.
