= Shahpur, Berasia =

Shahpur
- village
- Location within Madhya Pradesh Location within India
- Coordinates: 23.721094°N 77.375152°E
- Country: India
- State: Madhya Pradesh
- District: Bhopal
- Tehsil: Berasia

Population (2011)
  - Total: 544
- Time zone: UTC+5:30 (IST)
- ISO 3166 code: MP-IN
- Census code: 482211

Shahpur is a village in the Bhopal district of Madhya Pradesh, India. It is located in the Berasia tehsil, off the Nayasamand road.

== Demographics ==
According to the 2011 census of India, Shahpur has 119 households. The effective literacy rate (i.e. the literacy rate of population excluding children aged 6 and below) is 39.39%.

Demographics (2011 Census)
	Total	Male	Female
Population	544	293	251
Children aged below 6 years	120	61	59
Scheduled caste	64	33	31
Scheduled tribe	0	0	0
Literates	167	107	60
Workers (all)	144	135	9
Main workers (total)	58	50	8
Main workers: Cultivators	55	49	6
Main workers: Agricultural labourers	2	1	1
Main workers: Household industry workers	0	0	0
Main workers: Other	1	0	1
Marginal workers (total)	86	85	1
Marginal workers: Cultivators	1	1	0
Marginal workers: Agricultural labourers	83	82	1
Marginal workers: Household industry workers	0	0	0
Marginal workers: Others	2	2	0
Non-workers	400	158	242
