= Shahabad-e Sadat =

Shahabad-e Sadat شاه ابادسادات
- Village
- Location within Iran
- Coordinates: 32°19′58″N 49°15′00″E
- Country: Iran
- Province: Khuzestan
- County: Lali
- Bakhsh: Central
- Rural District: Sadat

Population (2006)
  - Total: 685
- Time zone: UTC+3:30 (IRST)
  - Summer (DST): UTC+4:30 (IRDT)

Shahabad-e Sadat (Persian: شاه ابادسادات, also Romanized as Shāhābād-e Sādāt; also known as Shāhābād) is a village in Sadat Rural District, in the Central District of Lali County, Khuzestan Province, Iran. At the 2006 census, its population was 685, in 102 families.
