= Shapur Sorath =

- Village
- Location in Gujarat, India
- Coordinates: 21.468066°N 70.370994°E
- Country: India
- State: Gujarat
- District: Junagadh

Area
  - Total: 20 km^{2} (7.7 sq mi)
- Elevation: 107 m (351 ft)

Population (2011)
  - Total: 8,108
  - Density: 410/km^{2} (1,000/sq mi)

Languages
  - Official: Gujarati, Hindi
- Time zone: UTC+5:30 (IST)
- PIN: 362 205
- Telephone code: 02872
- Vehicle registration: GJ-11
- Website: www.junagadhmunicipal.org

Shapur is a village in Vanthali taluk in Junagadh district in the Indian state of Gujarat. This region is known as "Sorath", after the former Princely State of Junagadh.

As of the 2011 census, Shapur had a population of 8,108 in 1,798 households.

== Geography ==
The village is 10 km southwest of Junagadh. The main road (Bazaar) divides village from the center. It connects Station and Ozat gates. It is about 3 km long and 30 feet wide, which is wider than other older villages' roads. It has paved sidewalks on both sides. The main road has more than 500 retail stores/businesses, banks, post offices, village administration office (Gram Panchayat Office) temples, mosques, vegetable market, fruit sellers, grocery shops, Pan Masala, bookstores, hotels, snack bars, cafés, repair shops, tailors, goldsmiths, blacksmiths, shoe makers, barber shops, clothes shops, STD/PCO stores, medical stores, electric stores, lumber and hardware stores, agricultural supply stores, sweet stores, etc.

Because of its connection with Junagadh-State's Navabs; Shapur was the most planned and developed village of the State. No village of its time in India was as organized as Shapur was. Since then (and even today), the village is protected by a strong fort with four main gates around. These gates are known as Station, Ozat, Khan and Ashram gates. Perhaps today, Shapur is the only "fort-village" of India with 15 feet tall fort with 3.5 feet wide walkway and guard-rail on its top. You can take a nice walk on top-of-fort from wide stairways constructed next to both sides of each gate of the fort. Each gate has big hall on its top, from where Navab's security guards used to monitor the outside activities of the village. The roads and streets of the village are parallel and perpendicular from one end to other end of the village.

Other main roads of the village are Ashram road, Kharakuva road, Khan Darvaja road, Patel Samaj road, Civil Hospital road, Society road and Navdurga road.

The various areas of the village are known as Kshatriya Kadiya Chowk, Patel Chock (cross section), Bank of Baroda Chock, Panchayat Chock, Navdurga Chock, Azad Chock, Banglapat, Jalaram Chock, Navafari, Rabari pa, Koli pa, Soni pa, Kandarvaja, Kharakuva, Raval ni pipal and Aadarsh Society.

== History ==
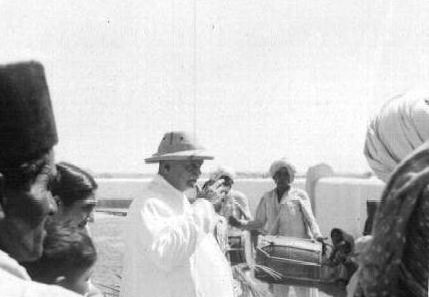
Kumar Shri Duleepsinhji is welcomed to the village

Shapur is as old as the Muslim-ruled Junagadh state. Before Indian Independence the village was the main military-base and Janana (Muslim Queens) residence of Muslim-ruled Junagadh state. The Navabs of Junagadh-State used to visit Shapur almost every day to meet their wives and children residing at Shapur. Later on Mahatma Gandhi, Sardar Vallabhbhai Patel and Indira Gandhi visited this villages for various independence and political reasons. Even after Indian independence Shapur remained important in regional and State politics, business, education and social advancement. Kumar Shri Duleepsinhji visited the first and the only public utility Thermal Power Station in that state, at that time located in Shahpur. He wanted to see personally the working conditions and the amenities provided for the villagers housing and the recreation facilities as this power station was using crushed coal as fuel for boilers and chlorination for the cooling water system, which normally polluted the local atmosphere.

The village-economy was almost destroyed after the flooding of 22 June 1983. Indian Prime Minister Mrs. Indira Gandhi was rushed to Shapur and was shocked after seeing villagers' loss of home, business, and crops. Later on the villagers and local leaders rebuilt the economy.

== Demographics ==
The village is residence place of Hindus and Muslims. The Hindu community includes Gurjar Kshatriya Kadia, Prajapati Kumbhar, Patel, Rabari, Koli, Lohana, Mochi, Dargi, Soni, Bramhins, Bavagis, Satvara, and Dalit. The Muslim community is made of Khoja, Gameti, Naghori and Sayads.

== Economy ==
Shapur is known for lignite based power generation plant owned by Gujarat Electricity Board. This is one of the biggest power generation facilities in Saurastra region and employs more than 2000 people locally.

Almost 50% of village business and shoppers come from smaller villages around Shapur. Along the main road, there are several retail shops inside the village. Shapur provides better employment / business / earning opportunities to local workers in farms, industries, retail businesses, ferries, vegetable and beauty stall –Laris etc. Shapur is also famous for oil, engineering, cement products and dairy industries around the region. They provide good deal of internal and external employment and business and economy. Some of the well known industries are:

- Thermal Power Station
- Nova Precision Industry.
- Trimurti ginning mill (Shashikant & Co.)
- Patel Oil mill (Mavji Hari oil cake industry)
- Press Oil and Cotton mill (Nanji Kalidas and group)
- Jalaram Oil mill (vormer Gordhan Jetha oil mill)
- Vipul Oil mill
- Hari Oil and seeds sampling
- Girnar Dairy
- Akash Ambry
- Patel Caol
- Shri Arun Industries
- Shri Momai Cement factory
- Shri Momai Oil mill
- Hari Oum Sweet
- Kismat Sweet etc.
- Raj tailor
- vinas ele.
- Soni Karshanji Kurji Lodiya and sons. ( SKKL & Sons )

After Junagadh became Municipal Corporation, Shapur is one of the best places to do business in real estate and farming land transfer. Farmers having farms on Junagadh road get very good value of their farms. People, who work in Junagadh but cannot afford living in Junagadh live in Shapur as commute to Junagadh is only 15 minutes. They save much money in taxes, grocery, and education and get an urban lifestyle and facilities in this modern village. By looking at the growth of region, it looks like Shapur has been partially merged with Junagadh and will be under the corporation's control within the next few years.

== Agriculture and farming ==
Shapur is only 1.5 km away from the Ozat River. Ozat is the third-largest river of Saurastra (128 km) with its most watersheds used for drinking water to Junagadh, Vanthali, Shapur and neighbor villages. After construction of Ozat-Vear dam near Shapur the tube wells of the region became so live with full of water, which made irrigation easy and affordable for farming. That is why the areas around Ozat river are the most greenest and best harvested in Junagadh district. These farms produce world-famous 'Kesar/saffron' mango -best in test and flavor among all species of mangos.

The farmers of Shapur take three crops per year that keeps farms green and live around the year. Farmers produces fruits, vegetables and flowers like mango, chiku, banana, sitafal, coconut, watermelon, cantaloupe, pupnus, grapes, egg-plants (bringers) peppers, cubage, cucumber, zucchini, turia, tomato, potato, cilantro, lemon, wheat, peanut (ground nut), beans, cotton, castrol, and spices are common produces of the area.

Because of the big production of fruits, vegetables and grains; the local farmers/vendors get opportunity to do business with cities like Junagadh, Rajkot, Ahmedabad, Baroda, Surat and up to Mumbai. On the other hand, these produces are very cheap in local market, making easy and wealthy lifestyle for local people.

The Patel and Rabari community mostly engaged in farming and dairy business. They sell milk and milk products to inside and outside of the village. Shapur's 'Hari Oum’ and 'Kismat' are well reputed dairy and sweet producers in the district, state and outside the country.

== Transport ==
Shapur is the last rail road junction on Junagadh-Veraval and Junagadh-Saradiya railroads. Even the train station is farther than the bus station it is always full of travelers because availability of longer distance trains. Frequent commuting facilities of trains, buses, and private taxi/cabs to Junagadh made Shapur as a part of Junagadh urban area. Commuter can find buses and cabs/autos for Junagadh in every five minutes.

Air: The nearest airports from Shapur are Keshod -25 km (at present not in use) and Rajkot -120 km.

Rail: The railway station of Shapur lies on Ahmadabad /Rajkot – Veraval,(Only local trains stop) connects it the major cities of the country.

Road: State transport and Junagadh municipal corporation buses link Shapur with all the major cities of the state.

== Education ==
Shapur was educational and cultural hub for neighbor villagers. The villagers take pride to have one of the best educational systems, schools, and teaching staffs in the district. Students come from nearby towns and villages including Vanthali (Taluka place) and Junagadh! The village has following schools:

- Sarvoday Ashram's Bal Mandir.
- Government primary school for boys.
- Government primary school for girls
- Government primary school for boys and girls at power house.
- Javahar Vinay Mandir's high school for boys and girls.
- Sarvoday Ashram primary school.
- Sarvoday Ashram high school.
- Sarvoday Ashram Adhyapan Mandir - PTC College
- Vivekananda education trust's primary school for boys and girls
- Vivekananda education trust's higher school for boys and girls
- Vivekananda education trust's higher secondary school for boys and girls
- Sanskar Vidhyalay

Shapur has an average literacy rate of 82%, higher than the national average of 59.5%:

== See also ==
- Asiatic lion
- Gir Forest National Park
- Siddis
- Shree Swaminarayan Mandir Junagadh
