= Shahabad, Iran =

Shahabad, Iran may refer to:

- Eslamabad-e Gharb, Kermanshah Province, Iran
- Qaem Shahr, Mazandaran Province, Iran
