= Holger Marius Nielsen =

Official of the Danish Ministry of Education (1905–1993)

Holger Marius Nielsen (1905–1993) was an official of the Danish Ministry of Education.

He was one of the editors of the Ordbog over det danske Sprog, which was edited and published from 1919 until 1956 in 28 volumes and is available on the internet. He was awarded the Order of the Dannebrog in 1965 after having been the chairman of a ministerial working group preparing a new bill on the education of Danish teachers in primary school. The bill was adopted by the Danish Parliament in 1966. He retired from his duties with the Ministry of Education in 1973.

Holger Marius Nielsen was the son of Peder Adolf Nielsen (1872–1962) and Caroline Marie Nielsen (1873–1937). He grew up with his two brothers, Axel Nielsen (1902–1970) and Povl Erik Nielsen (1909–1995) in Glostrup, 10 kilometres west of Copenhagen. He married Ellen Ingeborg Marie Andersen (1904–1983) and had two children, Jørgen Erik Nielsen (1933–2007) and Inge Lise Nielsen (born 1935).
