= Shahabad, Razavi Khorasan =

Shahabad شاه اباد
- Village
- Location within Iran
- Coordinates: 36°09′42″N 58°48′21″E
- Country: Iran
- Province: Razavi Khorasan
- County: Nishapur
- Bakhsh: Central
- Rural District: Rivand

Population (2006)
  - Total: 14
- Time zone: UTC+3:30 (IRST)
  - Summer (DST): UTC+4:30 (IRDT)

Shahabad (Persian: شاه اباد, also romanized as Shāhābād) is a village in Rivand Rural District, in the Central District of Nishapur County, Razavi Khorasan Province, Iran. At the 2006 census, its population was 14, in 4 families.
