= Shahpur, Sagar =

Shahpur
- Town
- Location in Madhya Pradesh, India
- Coordinates: 23.54°N 79.03°E
- Country: India
- State: Madhya Pradesh
- District: Sagar
- Elevation: 238 m (781 ft)

Population (2001)
  - Total: 12,205

Languages
  - Official: Hindi
- Time zone: UTC+5:30 (IST)
- ISO 3166 code: IN-MP
- Vehicle registration: MP

Shahpur is a town and a nagar parishad in Sagar district in the Indian state of Madhya Pradesh.

== Geography ==
Shahpur is located between the Sagar and Damoh districts. The main industry is agriculture, and several types of grain and vegetables are grown. It has an average elevation of 238 m (780 ft 10 in).

== Demographics ==
As of 2001 Census of India, Shahpur had a population of 12,205. Males constituted 52% of the population and females 48%. Shahpur had an average literacy rate of 59%, close to the national average of 59.5%. Male literacy was 69%, and female literacy was 47%. In Shahpur, 17% of the population was under 6 years of age.
