= Shahpur, Jharkhand =

Shahpur
- City and Town
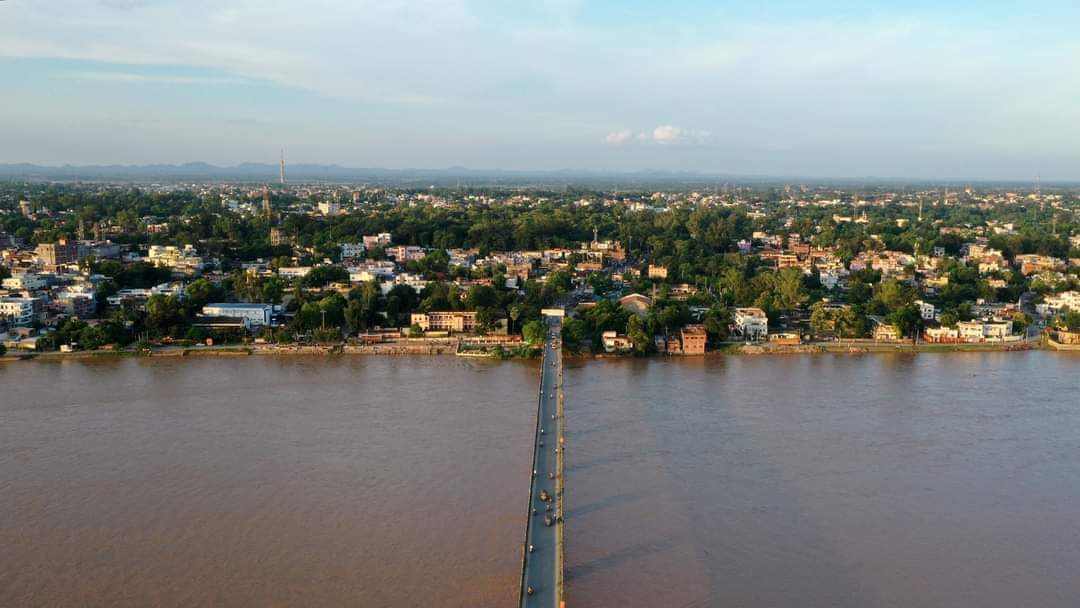
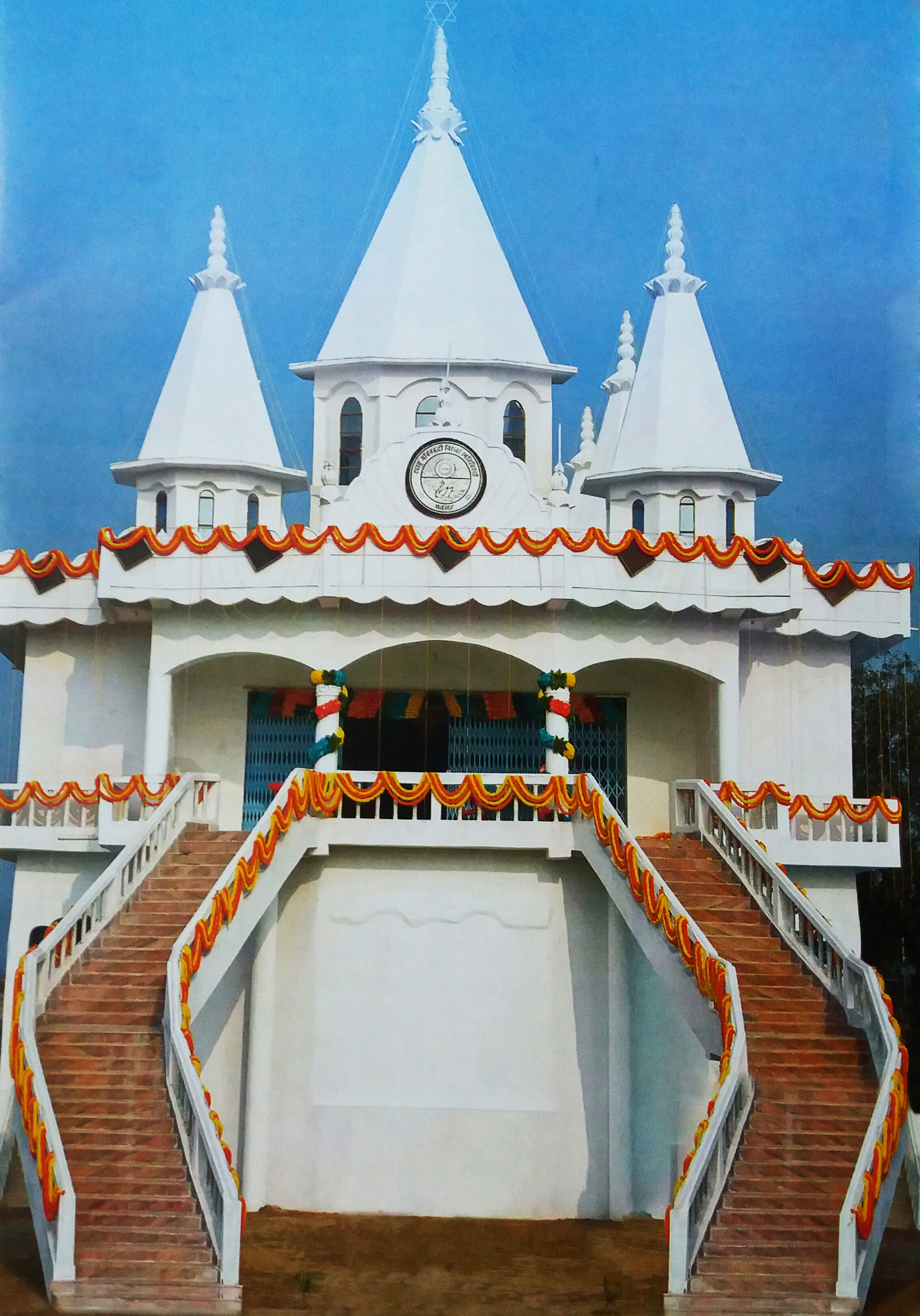
- Road in Shahpur
- Nickname: One of the historical cities in Jharkhand
- Shahpur is in Jharkhand, India
- Country: India
- State: Jharkhand
- District: Palamu district

Languages
  - Official: Hindi, Urdu

Shahpur is a city and a town in Palamu District, Jharkhand, India, near Medininagr (Daltonganj). It is a twin city of Medininagar and is one of the historical cities in Jharkhand, India. This city is connected by Medininagr through the Shahpur Bridge and is bordered and separated by the Koyal River. Shahpur has many historical places, landmarks, and monuments.

== Etymology ==
In this city's name, Shah is a Persian title given to Iran's peoples, kings, and lords. This name is widely used in the names of cities in many countries, including India, Pakistan, Nepal, Bangladesh, Burma, and Afghanistan, among others.

Pur is a placename element found in the names of cities in the Indian subcontinent, especially those in India, Bangladesh, and the eastern regions of Pakistan. Examples include the cities of Jaipur and Nagpur.

== Historical significance ==
Shahpur was built during Daltonganj's time. It has various historical landmarks, including the most famous Shahpur Fort. It is one of the oldest forts in the country, built during the time of the kings, lords, and the British. There is also a shrine located here.

== Education ==
=== Schools ===
- Mission Public School
- Patel Raman High School
- Red Rose Public School
- Sahodaya High School
- Sanskar Academy
- RMPSI Public School
- Rotary School Chainpur

== Economy ==
The economy of Shahpur is dependent on tourism, trade and commerce. There are transport connections between Shahpur and Daltonganj. Daltonganj and the government fulfill the needs of Shahpur. Shahpur has various stores and banks.

Authorised traders in Shahpur include Jaiswal Traders, Shree Durga Traders, etc. They trade various types of cement, building materials, etc. A water supply pump is located in Shahpur at North Koel River.

== Tourist attractions ==
- Shahpur Fort
- Hazrat Karim Shah Wali Data Mazar
- Shiv Mandir
- Jama Masjid Shahpur
- Koyal River
- Shahpur Bridge

== See also ==
- Medininagar (Daltonganj)
