= Behta Kalan =

Behta Kalan Behta Kalān
- Village
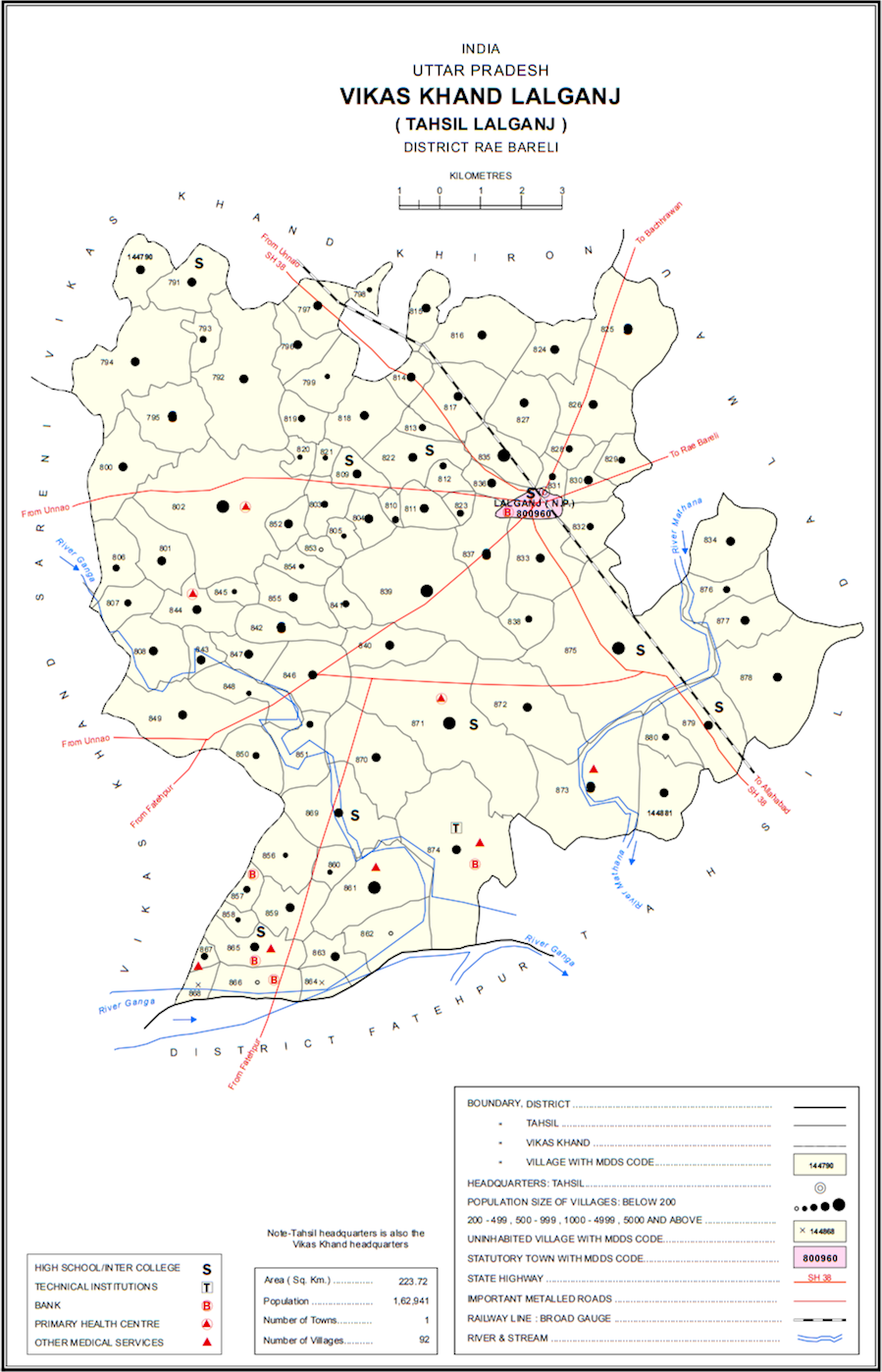
- Map showing Behta Kalan (#802) in Lalganj CD block

- Location in Uttar Pradesh, India
- Coordinates: 26.168037°N 80.893024°E
- Country India: India
- State: Uttar Pradesh
- District: Raebareli

Area
  - Total: 7.818 km^{2} (3.019 sq mi)

Population (2011)
  - Total: 6,148
  - Density: 786.4/km^{2} (2,037/sq mi)

Languages
  - Official: Hindi
- Time zone: UTC+5:30 (IST)
- Vehicle registration: UP-35

Behta Kalan is a village in Lalganj block of Rae Bareli district, Uttar Pradesh, India. It is located 8 km (5.0 mi) from Lalganj, the block and tehsil headquarters, a bit to the north of the road connecting it and Rae Bareli, the district headquarters.

As of 2011, Behta Kalan has a population of 6,148 people, in 1,061 households. It hosts a market twice per week, on Mondays and Thursdays, specialising in cloth and vegetables.

== History ==
At the turn of the 20th century, Behta Kalan was described as being almost completely surrounded by orchards, with the spire of the Mahadeo temple rising above them. The temple had been built "some years ago" for a cost of Rs. 50,000. The village possessed a post office, a large middle vernacular school, and a small bazar. Its population as of 1901 was 3,565; it was held in taluqdari tenure as part of the Murarmau estate, and at that point was held by the Rana of Khajurgaon.

The 1961 census recorded Behta Kalan as comprising 14 hamlets, with a total population of 3,623 people (1,779 male and 1,844 female), in 652 households and 562 physical houses. The area of the village was given as 1,932 acres and it had a post office at that point. It also had two government-run dispensaries, one for males and one for females, and each one had 6 beds. Typical market attendance was listed at about 200 people.

The 1981 census recorded Behta Kalan as having a population of 4,614 people, in 824 households, and having an area of 790.76 hectares. The main staple foods were listed as wheat and rice.
