= List of Guggenheim Fellowships awarded in 1974 =

A total of 342 scholars, artists, and scientists received Guggenheim Fellowships in 1974. $4,151,500 was disbursed between the recipients, who were chosen from an applicant pool of 2,668. Of the 113 universities represented, University of California, Berkeley boasted the most faculty winners (17), with Columbia University (15) in second, and Harvard University and University of Pennsylvania (11) in third. This was the 50th annual competition.

== United States and Canada fellows ==
Category	Field of Study	Fellow	Institutional association	Research topic	Notes	Ref
Creative Arts	Choreography	Stephanie Evanitsky	Staten Island Community College	Transposition of Picasso's vision and freedom into dance		
Creative Arts	Choreography	Phyllis Lamhut	Phyllis Lamhut Dance Company	Dance performance: Country Mozart		
Creative Arts	Choreography	Twyla Tharp	Twyla Tharp Dance		Also won in 1971	
Creative Arts	Drama and Performance Art	Paul Foster	La MaMa Theatre	Playwriting		
Creative Arts	Drama and Performance Art	Frank Gagliano	University of Texas at Austin	Playwriting		
Creative Arts	Drama and Performance Art	William M. Hoffman		Playwriting		
Creative Arts	Drama and Performance Art	Mark Medoff	New Mexico State University	Playwriting		
Creative Arts	Drama and Performance Art	Susan Yankowitz		Playwriting		
Creative Arts	Fiction	Robert Coover		Writing	Also won in 1971	
Creative Arts	Fiction	George Palmer Garrett	University of South Carolina	Writing		
Creative Arts	Fiction	Shirley Hazzard		Writing		
Creative Arts	Fiction	Jack Matthews	Ohio University	Writing		
Creative Arts	Fiction	Tom McHale	Northeastern University	Writing		
Creative Arts	Fiction	Charles Newman	Northwestern University	Writing		
Creative Arts	Fiction	Richard Rhodes		Writing		
Creative Arts	Fiction	Alexander L. Theroux	Harvard University	Writing		
Creative Arts	Fiction	Al Young	Stanford University	Writing		
Creative Arts	Fiction	John A. Yount	University of New Hampshire	Writing		
Creative Arts	Film	David N. Hancock	Rice University			
Creative Arts	Film	James Francis Ivory	Merchant Ivory Productions			
Creative Arts	Film	Paul Ronder	Brooklyn College			
Creative Arts	Film	John Luther Schofill, Jr.				
Creative Arts	Film	Ralph Steiner		Production of Slow Down, "which has as a theme the creative human function of looking, seeing and feeling"		
Creative Arts	Fine Arts	Michael Asher		Artwork		
Creative Arts	Fine Arts	Robert Beauchamp		Painting		
Creative Arts	Fine Arts	Nell Blaine		Painting		
Creative Arts	Fine Arts	Howard Buchwald		Painting		
Creative Arts	Fine Arts	Gene Davis		Painting		
Creative Arts	Fine Arts	Charles Ginnever	Windham College	Sculpture		
Creative Arts	Fine Arts	Sandria Hu	East Texas State College	Printmaking		
Creative Arts	Fine Arts	Jane A. Kaufman				
Creative Arts	Fine Arts	Barry Le Va		Sculpture		
Creative Arts	Fine Arts	William Majors		Equipping his New Hampshire studio for painting and printmaking		
Creative Arts	Fine Arts	Nicholas Marsicano	Cooper Union School of Art and Architecture	Painting and graphics		
Creative Arts	Fine Arts	Richard Nonas		Sculpture		
Creative Arts	Fine Arts	Joel Perlman	School of Visual Arts, New York City	Sculpture		
Creative Arts	Fine Arts	Edwin Bennett Shostak		Sculpture		
Creative Arts	Fine Arts	Steven Sloman	New York Studio School	Painting		
Creative Arts	Fine Arts	William Tarr		Sculpture		
Creative Arts	Fine Arts	James A. Turrell		Enclosure and sky space in the Arizona desert		
Creative Arts	Fine Arts	David Von Schlegell	Yale University	Sculpture		
Creative Arts	Fine Arts	Sanford Wurmfeld	Hunter College, CUNY	Painting		
Creative Arts	Music Composition	Ornette Coleman		Composing	Also won in 1967	
Creative Arts	Music Composition	Primous Fountain		Composing	Also won in 1977	
Creative Arts	Music Composition	Meyer Kupferman	Sarah Lawrence College	Composing		
Creative Arts	Music Composition	Fred Lerdahl	Harvard University	Composing		
Creative Arts	Music Composition	Otto Luening	Columbia-Princeton Electronic Music Center	Composing	Also won in 1930 and 1931	
Creative Arts	Music Composition	Thea Musgrave		Composing	Also won in 1982	
Creative Arts	Music Composition	Pandit Pran Nath	Mills College (visiting)	Music composition within the Kirana style of Indian classical music		
Creative Arts	Music Composition	George Perle	Queens College	Composing	Also won in 1966	
Creative Arts	Music Composition	R. Murray Schafer	Simon Fraser University	Composition of two major works, one for the National Arts Centre and one for the Festival Singers of Canada		
Creative Arts	Music Composition	David F. Stock	Antioch College	Composing		
Creative Arts	Music Composition	Robert Suderburg	North Carolina School of the Arts	Composing	Also won in 1968	
Creative Arts	Music Composition	Preston A. Trombly	Yale University	Composing		
Creative Arts	Music Composition	Donald F. Wheelock	Amherst College	Composing	Also won in 1984	
Creative Arts	Photography	William Clift		New Mexico landscape "considered sacred by the Indians"	Also won in 1980	
Creative Arts	Photography	Michael Di Biase		Photography		
Creative Arts	Photography	Jim Dow	School of the Museum of Fine Arts, Boston	Signs across the United States		
Creative Arts	Photography	William J. Eggleston		Cheap color printing		
Creative Arts	Photography	Emmet Gowin	Princeton University	Peru and Ireland		
Creative Arts	Photography	André Kertész		Photography		
Creative Arts	Photography	Roger Mertin	Rochester Institute of Technology	Documentation of trees		
Creative Arts	Photography	Ken T. Ohara	Menken Seltzer Studios	Photography		
Creative Arts	Photography	Tetsu Okuhara		Photography		
Creative Arts	Photography	Frederick Sommer		Photography		
Creative Arts	Photography	Alwyn Scott Turner		Photography		
Creative Arts	Photography	Don Worth	San Francisco State University	American landscape		
Creative Arts	Poetry	Stephen Berg	University of the Arts	Writing		
Creative Arts	Poetry	Russell Edson		Writing		
Creative Arts	Poetry	Jill Hoffman	Brooklyn College	Writing		
Creative Arts	Poetry	Galway Kinnell	Brandeis University (visiting)	Writing	Also won in 1962	
Creative Arts	Poetry	Etheridge Knight		Writing		
Creative Arts	Poetry	Christopher Middleton	University of Texas at Austin	Writing		
Creative Arts	Poetry	Jerome Rothenberg	University of California-San Diego	Writing		
Creative Arts	Poetry	Mark Strand	Brandeis University (visiting)	Writing		
Creative Arts	Poetry	C. K. Williams		Writing		
Creative Arts	Poetry	Jay Wright		Writing		
Creative Arts	Video & Audio	Keith Sonnier				
Humanities	American Literature	J. A. Leo Lemay	University of California, Los Angeles			
Humanities	American Literature	Hershel Parker	University of Southern California	Herman Melville's compositional methods		
Humanities	American Literature	Richard Poirier	Rutgers University	Poetry and poetic career of Robert Frost		
Humanities	American Literature	Henry Nash Smith	University of California, Berkeley	Theme of inner freedom in 19th-century American fiction		
Humanities	American Literature	Reed Whittemore	University of Maryland, College Park	William Carlos Williams		
Humanities	Architecture, Planning and Design	Donald Appleyard	University of California, Berkeley	Urban environmental studies		
Humanities	Architecture, Planning and Design	Roberto G. Brambilla	Columbia University (visiting)	Documentary study of New York City's process of growth and change		
Humanities	Architecture, Planning and Design	Stephen Carr	Arrowstreet, Inc.			
Humanities	Architecture, Planning and Design	John M. Jacobus Jr.	Dartmouth College			
Humanities	Biography	Kenneth Sydney Davis		Franklin D. Roosevelt, 1928-1945		
Humanities	Biography	Elinor Langer	Goddard College	Josephine Herbst		
Humanities	Biography	Frank MacShane	Columbia University	Raymond Chandler		
Humanities	British History	Bernard Semmel	State University of New York at Stony Brook	John Stuart Mill	Also won in 1967	
Humanities	Classics	Norman Austin	University of California, Los Angeles			
Humanities	Classics	Brunilde S. Ridgway	Bryn Mawr College			
Humanities	Classics	Hans-Peter Stahl	Yale University	Propertius and Euripides		
Humanities	Classics	Robert Dale Sweeney	Vanderbilt University			
Humanities	Dance Studies	Marcia B. Siegel				
Humanities	East Asian Studies	Philip A. Kuhn	University of Chicago			
Humanities	East Asian Studies	Barbara Stoler Miller	Barnard College	Medieval Sanskrit poetry and its modern expressions		
Humanities	Economic History	Scott M. Eddie	University of Toronto	Agrarian reform in East Europe, 1919-1938		
Humanities	English Literature	Robert M. Adams	University of California, Los Angeles	"What is left in the novel in the wake of Joyce"	Also won in 1959	
Humanities	English Literature	Flavia Alaya	Ramapo College of New Jersey	Italy as an imaginative concept among Victorian writers		
Humanities	English Literature	Gerald L. Bruns	University of Iowa	Victorian thought, examining leading nonfiction prose writers of the period"	Also won in 1985	
Humanities	English Literature	Clarence Lee Cline	University of Texas at Austin	Letters to and from the Rossetti family		
Humanities	English Literature	Bertram H. Davis	Florida State University			
Humanities	English Literature	Donald M. Friedman	University of California, Berkeley	The idea of imagination in the Renaissance from Wyatt to Milton		
Humanities	English Literature	Martin Burgess Green	Tufts University		Also won in 1977	
Humanities	English Literature	Stephen J. Greenblatt	University of California, Berkeley	Fashioning of the self in the English Renaissance	Also won in 1982	
Humanities	English Literature	Jean H. Hagstrum	Northwestern University			
Humanities	English Literature	Norman Kelvin	City College of New York			
Humanities	English Literature	Frank D. McConnell	Northwestern University			
Humanities	English Literature	Michael Murrin	University of Chicago	Allegory and epic in the Renaissance		
Humanities	English Literature	Bernard J. Paris	Michigan State University	"Analysis of great characters in English fiction in their relation to the larger structure of the novel"		
Humanities	English Literature	Humphrey R. Tonkin	University of Pennsylvania	Structure of Spenser's The Faerie Queen		
Humanities	English Literature	Robert Y. Turner	University of Pennsylvania	Shakespeare's late plays and Jacobean tragicomedy		
Humanities	English Literature	John Britton Vickery	University of California, Riverside	"Poetry, myth and philosophical fiction in the 20th and late 19th centuries"		
Humanities	Fine Arts Research	Albert Boime	Binghamton University		Also won in 1984	
Humanities	Fine Arts Research	George M. Cohen	Northwestern University			
Humanities	Fine Arts Research	Van Deren Coke	University of New Mexico	Exent of photography's influence on modern art		
Humanities	Fine Arts Research	Phyllis J. Freeman				
Humanities	Fine Arts Research	Charles James		To write a textbook about his esoteric theory of "meta-morphology" but died before finishing		
Humanities	Fine Arts Research	Barbara Novak	Barnard College	Cultural history of 19th-century American landscape painting		
Humanities	Fine Arts Research	Theodore Reff	Columbia University	Crisis in Impressionism and reactions against it in French art of the 1880s	Also won in 1967	
Humanities	Fine Arts Research	David Rosand	Columbia University	Pictorial structure and narrative mode in Venetian painting of the Renaissance		
Humanities	Fine Arts Research	Patricia H. Sloane				
Humanities	Folklore and Popular Culture	Israel J. Katz	Columbia University	Comparative musiological study of the Sephardic and Spanish traditional ballads		
Humanities	Folklore and Popular Culture	Gabrielle Yablonsky		Bhutanese art		
Humanities	French History	Donald R. Kelley	University of Rochester	Repression and resistance in Reformation Europe	Also won in 1981	
Humanities	French History	Charles Tilly	University of Michigan	Evolution of collective action in modern France		
Humanities	French Literature	Barbara C. Bowen	University of Illinois, Urbana-Champaign	Structural and aesthetic function of language in the literature of the French Renaissance		
Humanities	French Literature	Jean Louis Bruneau	Harvard University			
Humanities	French Literature	Bettina L. Knapp	Hunter College			
Humanities	French Literature	James R. Lawler	University of California, Los Angeles			
Humanities	General Nonfiction	Mark Harris	University of California (visiting)	Autobiography	Also won in 1965	
Humanities	General Nonfiction	Victor S. Navasky				
Humanities	General Nonfiction	Robert Pirsig		"Companion volume" for Zen and the Art of Motorcycle Maintenance, on social problems between whites and Native Americans; became Lila: An Inquiry into Morals		
Humanities	General Nonfiction	Lillian Ross	The New Yorker			
Humanities	German & East European History	Martin E. Jay	University of California, Berkeley	Totality in 20th-century Marxist thought		
Humanities	German & East European History	David Schoenbaum	University of Iowa	Zabern Affair		
Humanities	German and Scandinavian Literature	Mark Boulby	University of British Columbia	18th-century German literature		
Humanities	German and Scandinavian Literature	James K. Lyon	University of California, San Diego			
Humanities	German and Scandinavian Literature	Heinz Politzer	University of California, Berkeley	Critical biography of Freud	Also won in 1958 and 1966	
Humanities	German and Scandinavian Literature	Lawrence Ryan	University of Massachusetts, Amherst			
Humanities	German and Scandinavian Literature	Ulrich W. Weisstein	Indiana University	"Expressionism as an international literary phenomenon"		
Humanities	History of Science and Technology	Saul Benison	University of Cincinnati	History of polio		
Humanities	History of Science and Technology	Bernard R. Goldstein	University of Pittsburgh	Medieval astronomy		
Humanities	History of Science and Technology	Howard Stein	Columbia University	Formation and transformation of fundamental concepts in classical physics		
Humanities	Iberian & Latin American History	Edward E. Malefakis	University of Michigan	Spanish socialism, 1870-1939		
Humanities	Italian Literature	Fredi Chiappelli	University of California, Los Angeles	Development of Machiavelli's language and thought during his early political career, 1498-1503		
Humanities	Italian Literature	Douglas Radcliff-Umstead	University of Pittsburgh			
Humanities	Latin American Literature	Thomas E. Skidmore	University of Wisconsin, Madison	Brazilian development, 1964-1974		
Humanities	Linguistics	Matthew Y. Chen	University of California, San Diego	Diachronic phonology from Middle Chinese to modern dialects		
Humanities	Linguistics	Brian E. Newton	Simon Fraser University	Verbal aspect of modern Greek		
Humanities	Linguistics	Paolo Valesio	New York University	Figures of speech in Romance languages		
Humanities	Linguistics	Gernot Ludwig Windfuhr	University of Michigan	Linguistic dynamics on the Iranian plateau		
Humanities	Literary Criticism	Hazard Adams	University of California, Irvine	"Theory of literary symbolism, symbolic form and myth"		
Humanities	Literary Criticism	Edward Alexander	University of Washington			
Humanities	Medieval History	Robert Somerville	Columbia University	Canon law in the 11th and 12th centuries	Also won in 1987	
Humanities	Medieval Literature	Penelope Billings Reed Doob	York University			
Humanities	Medieval Literature	John P. McCall	University of Cincinnati	"Influence on Chaucer of 14th-century translations into the vernacular"		
Humanities	Medieval Literature	Alan H. Nelson	University of California, Berkeley	Art and doctrine in English morality plays		
Humanities	Medieval Literature	Fred C. Robinson	Yale University	English philology and literary interpretation		
Humanities	Medieval Literature	Winthrop Wetherbee	Cornell University	Chaucer's use of the traditions of medieval poetry concerning the theme of love		
Humanities	Music Research	Ira Gitler		Oral history that became Swing to Bop (published 1985)		
Humanities	Music Research	Michael Kassler		Functions of a standardized music theory transferred into STSC's APL*Plus system		
Humanities	Music Research	Clement A. Miller	John Carroll University	Annotated edition of correspondence between Renaissance musicians		
Humanities	Near Eastern Studies	John Walton Barker, Jr.	University of Wisconsin	"History, diplomatic, institutional, and cultural relations between Byzantium and Genoa in the later Middle Ages"		
Humanities	Near Eastern Studies	Joseph A. Callaway	Southern Baptist Theological Seminary			
Humanities	Near Eastern Studies	Richard G. Hovannisian	University of California, Los Angeles			
Humanities	Near Eastern Studies	Erica Reiner	University of Chicago			
Humanities	Philosophy	William Barrett				
Humanities	Philosophy	James W. Cornman	University of Pennsylvania	Theory of empirical knowledge		
Humanities	Philosophy	Joel Feinberg	University of Arizona			
Humanities	Philosophy	Lawrence Sklar	University of Michigan	Structures for rational belief		
Humanities	Philosophy	Robert C. Stalnaker	Cornell University	Logical structure of propositions and propositional attitudes		
Humanities	Religion	Eldon J. Epp	Case Western Reserve University	"Early history of the manuscript traditions of the Greek New Testament"		
Humanities	Religion	Peter C. Hodgson	Vanderbilt University			
Humanities	Religion	Krister Stendahl	Harvard Divinity School		Also won in 1959	
Humanities	Renaissance History	Werner L. Gundersheimer	University of Pennsylvania	Despots and Florence in the 15th century		
Humanities	Russian History	Theodore H. Von Laue	Clark University	African history and anthropology	Also won in 1962	
Humanities	Russian History	Alexander Vucinich	University of Texas at Austin	Third volume in his Science in Russian Culture series	Also won in 1985	
Humanities	Science Writing	Gerald Jonas				
Humanities	Spanish and Portuguese Literature	Brian Dutton	University of Illinois at Chicago			
Humanities	Spanish and Portuguese Literature	Leon Livingstone	State University of New York at Buffalo			
Humanities	Theatre Arts	Marian Hannah Winter				
Humanities	United States History	Jerold S. Auerbach	Wellesley College			
Humanities	United States History	Richard L. Bushman	Boston University	History of the Latter Day Saints		
Humanities	United States History	Louis R. Harlan	University of Maryland			
Humanities	United States History	Akira Iriye	University of Chicago			
Humanities	United States History	Christopher Lasch	University of Rochester			
Humanities	United States History	Claudia A. Lopez	The Papers of Benjamin Franklin, Yale University	Benjamin Franklin, his family and his friends		
Humanities	United States History	Bertram Wyatt-Brown	Case Western Reserve University	Cultural differences between the North and South at the time of the Civil War		
Natural Sciences	Applied Mathematics	Allen T. Chwang	California Institute of Technology			
Natural Sciences	Applied Mathematics	C. Allin Cornell	Massachusetts Institute of Technology			
Natural Sciences	Applied Mathematics	Thomas E. Everhart	University of California, Berkeley	Scanning electron microscopy and microfabrication		
Natural Sciences	Applied Mathematics	John W. Hutchinson	Harvard University			
Natural Sciences	Applied Mathematics	Watt Wetmore Webb	Cornell University	Physical probes of biological processes		
Natural Sciences	Applied Mathematics	Paul F. Zweifel	Virginia Polytechnic Institute and State University	Linear transport theory		
Natural Sciences	Astronomy-Astrophysics	David Bodansky	University of Washington		Also won in 1966	
Natural Sciences	Astronomy-Astrophysics	Frank J. Kerr	University of Maryland			
Natural Sciences	Astronomy-Astrophysics	Gerry Neugebauer	California Institute of Technology	Research at the Institute of Astronomy, Cambridge		
Natural Sciences	Astronomy-Astrophysics	Edward A. Spiegel	Columbia University	Research at the Institute of Astronomy, Cambridge	Astrophysics	
Natural Sciences	Chemistry	Robert A. Bernheim	Pennsylvania State University	Laser detection of magnetic resonances in transient molecular species, especially using tunable dye lasers		
Natural Sciences	Chemistry	Jacob Bigeleisen	University of Rochester	Isotope chemistry		
Natural Sciences	Chemistry	George R. Bird	Rutgers University	Chemistry and physics of photographic processes		
Natural Sciences	Chemistry	Philip R. Brooks	Rice University			
Natural Sciences	Chemistry	Ernest R. Davidson	University of Washington			
Natural Sciences	Chemistry	John M. Deutch	Massachusetts Institute of Technology			
Natural Sciences	Chemistry	George W. Flynn	Columbia University	Physical chemistry		
Natural Sciences	Chemistry	Melvin J. Goldstein	Cornell University	Physical organic chemistry		
Natural Sciences	Chemistry	William DeW. Horrocks Jr.	Pennsylvania State University	Paramagnetic metal ions as probes of structure and function in enzyme systems		
Natural Sciences	Chemistry	Walter Kauzmann	Princeton University		Also won in 1956	
Natural Sciences	Chemistry	Robert Shing-Hei Liu	University of Hawaii at Manoa	Photophysics and photochemistry		
Natural Sciences	Chemistry	John Paul McTague	University of California, Los Angeles			
Natural Sciences	Chemistry	Kurt Mislow	Princeton University	Research at the University of Cambridge	Also won in 1956	
Natural Sciences	Chemistry	George H. Morrison	Cornell University	Ion microprobe analysis		
Natural Sciences	Chemistry	Philip Pechukas	Columbia University	Theoretical chemistry		
Natural Sciences	Chemistry	J. W. Robinson	Louisiana State University			
Natural Sciences	Chemistry	Paul N. Schatz	University of Virginia	Inorganic spectroscopy		
Natural Sciences	Chemistry	William B. Streett	United States Military Academy	Liquids at the molecular level		
Natural Sciences	Chemistry	Robert Yaris	Washington University in St. Louis	Theoretical chemistry		
Natural Sciences	Computer Science	Frederick P. Brooks Jr.	University of North Carolina at Chapel Hill	Computer architecture and human factors of computer systems		
Natural Sciences	Computer Science	Seymour Ginsburg	University of Southern California	Grammars, formal languages and automata theory		
Natural Sciences	Earth Science	William A. Clemens	University of California, Berkeley	Paleobiogeographic studies of European fauna		
Natural Sciences	Earth Science	Robert L. Parker	University of California, San Diego			
Natural Sciences	Earth Science	Frank M. Richter	Massachusetts Institute of Technology			
Natural Sciences	Engineering	John C. Berg	University of Washington			
Natural Sciences	Engineering	Julian Szekely	University of Buffalo			
Natural Sciences	Mathematics	Frederick J. Almgren Jr.	Princeton University	Geometric measure theory		
Natural Sciences	Mathematics	Jonathan L. Alperin	University of Chicago			
Natural Sciences	Mathematics	Roger W. Brockett	Harvard University	Mathematical system theory		
Natural Sciences	Mathematics	William Browder	Princeton University	Topology		
Natural Sciences	Mathematics	Clifford J. Earle Jr.	Cornell University	Differential topology of Riemann surfaces		
Natural Sciences	Mathematics	Samuel Eilenberg	Columbia University	Automaton theory	Also won in 1950	
Natural Sciences	Mathematics	Leonard Gross	Cornell University	Constructive quantum field theory		
Natural Sciences	Mathematics	Robion C. Kirby	University of California, Berkeley	Topology		
Natural Sciences	Mathematics	Shlomo Sternberg	Harvard University			
Natural Sciences	Mathematics	Raymond O'Neil Wells	Rice University			
Natural Sciences	Medicine and Health	Martin C. Carey	Boston University School of Medicine			
Natural Sciences	Medicine and Health	Ronald A. Castellino	Stanford University	Education in diagnostic oncologic radiology and studies in lymphography		
Natural Sciences	Medicine and Health	Frank W. Fitch	University of Chicago			
Natural Sciences	Medicine and Health	Irma Gigli	Harvard Medical School			
Natural Sciences	Medicine and Health	Robert E. Goldstein	Uniformed Services University of the Health Sciences	Research at St George's Hospital		
Natural Sciences	Medicine and Health	Donald B. Martin	Harvard Medical School	Research in Geneva		
Natural Sciences	Medicine and Health	Fred S. Rosen	Harvard Medical School			
Natural Sciences	Molecular and Cellular Biology	James B. Boyd	University of California, Davis	DNA repair in drosophila		
Natural Sciences	Molecular and Cellular Biology	Bob B. Buchanan	University of California, Berkeley	Enzyme regulation in photosynthesis		
Natural Sciences	Molecular and Cellular Biology	Robert S. Edgar	University of California, Santa Cruz	Developmental genetics		
Natural Sciences	Molecular and Cellular Biology	Gerald David Fasman	Brandeis University		Also won in 1988	
Natural Sciences	Molecular and Cellular Biology	Gerald R. Fink	Cornell University	Regulation of protein synthesis in yeast		
Natural Sciences	Molecular and Cellular Biology	Robert Haselkorn	University of Chicago	Research at Institut Pasteur		
Natural Sciences	Molecular and Cellular Biology	Harry P. C. Hogenkamp	University of Iowa	Structure and function of vitamin B-12		
Natural Sciences	Molecular and Cellular Biology	Nathan O. Kaplan	University of California San Diego		Also won in 1964	
Natural Sciences	Molecular and Cellular Biology	Robert M. Kark	University of Illinois		Also won in 1961	
Natural Sciences	Molecular and Cellular Biology	Lewis J. Kleinsmith	University of Michigan	Phosphorylation of nuclear proteins during the cell cycle		
Natural Sciences	Molecular and Cellular Biology	John S. Leigh Jr.	University of Pennsylvania	Molecular mechanisms of muscle contraction		
Natural Sciences	Molecular and Cellular Biology	Stuart M. Linn	University of California, Berkeley	Enzymes of DNA metabolism during cellular aging		
Natural Sciences	Molecular and Cellular Biology	Susan Lowey	Brandeis University			
Natural Sciences	Molecular and Cellular Biology	Edward Novitski	University of Oregon		Also won in 1945	
Natural Sciences	Molecular and Cellular Biology	Robert P. Perry	University of Pennsylvania	Molecular biology		
Natural Sciences	Molecular and Cellular Biology	Edward Reich	Rockefeller University			
Natural Sciences	Molecular and Cellular Biology	John R. Roth	University of California, Berkeley	Genetic suppression of yeast and bacteria		
Natural Sciences	Molecular and Cellular Biology	Paul B. Sigler	University of Chicago			
Natural Sciences	Molecular and Cellular Biology	Alfred Stracher	SUNY Downstate Health Sciences University	Zoology research at Oxford University		
Natural Sciences	Molecular and Cellular Biology	Jack L. Strominger	Harvard University			
Natural Sciences	Neuroscience	Solomon D. Erulkar	University of Pennsylvania	Neurophysiology		
Natural Sciences	Neuroscience	David Ford Lindsley	University of Southern California			
Natural Sciences	Neuroscience	Ernest Noble	University of California, Irvine	Biochemistry and neurochemistry of alcoholism		
Natural Sciences	Neuroscience	Frank Simon Werblin	University of California, Berkeley	Neurophysiology of vision		
Natural Sciences	Organismic Biology and Ecology	Andrew S. Bajer	University of Oregon			
Natural Sciences	Organismic Biology and Ecology	Dohn G. Glitz	University of California, Los Angeles			
Natural Sciences	Organismic Biology and Ecology	Alan J. Kohn	University of Washington			
Natural Sciences	Organismic Biology and Ecology	Lawrence B. Slobodkin	State University of New York at Stony Brook	How organisms respond to changes in their environment	Also won in 1961	
Natural Sciences	Physics	Korkut Bardakci	University of California, Berkeley	High energy and elementary particle physics		
Natural Sciences	Physics	Theodore H. Geballe	Stanford University	Superconductivity		
Natural Sciences	Physics	Sidney H. Kahana	Brookhaven National Laboratory			
Natural Sciences	Physics	James S. Langer	Carnegie-Mellon University			
Natural Sciences	Physics	David M. Lee	Cornell University	Ion microprobe analysis	Also won in 1966	
Natural Sciences	Physics	Edgar Lipworth	Brandeis University	Research at Hebrew University of Jerusalem		
Natural Sciences	Physics	Joaquin M. Luttinger	Columbia University	Solid state physics		
Natural Sciences	Physics	Leon Madansky	Johns Hopkins University	Research at CERN		
Natural Sciences	Physics	Raymond Mountain	National Bureau of Standards	Research at the Institute for Theoretical Physics at Utrecht University		
Natural Sciences	Physics	Robert E. Ricklefs	University of Pennsylvania	Evolutionary ecology of birds		
Natural Sciences	Physics	Roman Smoluchowski	Princeton University	Solid state physics		
Natural Sciences	Physics	William Ira Weisberger	State University of New York at Stony Brook	Elementary particle physics		
Natural Sciences	Plant Sciences	George Bruening	University of California, Davis	Mechanisms of plant virus replication		
Natural Sciences	Plant Sciences	Harold A. Mooney	Stanford University	Environmental constraints in the form and function of plants		
Natural Sciences	Plant Sciences	Barbara G. Pickard	Washington University in St. Louis	Plant physiology		
Natural Sciences	Plant Sciences	Klaus Raschke	Michigan State University	Biochemical and physiological movement of plant stomata		
Natural Sciences	Statistics	David O. Siegmund	Columbia University	Sequential statistical analysis		
Natural Sciences	Statistics	Walter Laws Smith	University of North Carolina at Chapel Hill	Branch of probability theory		
Social Sciences	Anthropology and Cultural Studies	Paul T. Baker	Pennsylvania State University	Human population biology		
Social Sciences	Anthropology and Cultural Studies	Laura Bohannan	University of Illinois at Chicago	Tiv witchcraft, magic and religion		
Social Sciences	Anthropology and Cultural Studies	Ralph L. Holloway Jr.	Columbia University	Evolution of the human brain		
Social Sciences	Anthropology and Cultural Studies	Robert Earl Johannes				
Social Sciences	Anthropology and Cultural Studies	Joseph G. Jorgensen	University of Michigan	Comparative history and culture of western North American Indians		
Social Sciences	Anthropology and Cultural Studies	Joan P. Mencher	City University of New York	Roots of the ongoing political conflict in Northern Ireland		
Social Sciences	Economics	Edwin Burmeister	University of Pennsylvania	Economics of capital and time		
Social Sciences	Economics	Robert E. Jensen	Trinity University	Measurement of economic, social and environmental impact of business firms		
Social Sciences	Economics	Wallace E. Oates	Princeton University	Economics of metropolitan government		
Social Sciences	Economics	Edward C. Prescott	University of Minnesota			
Social Sciences	Economics	Ryuzo Sato	Brown University			
Social Sciences	Education	Douglas M. Sloan	Columbia University	Higher learning in New York City, 1860-1918		
Social Sciences	Geography & Environmental Studies	James T. Lemon	University of Toronto			
Social Sciences	Law	Joseph W. Bishop Jr.	Yale University	Law and practice in the use of the British armed forces to control major domestic emergencies		
Social Sciences	Law	Alfred F. Conard	University of Michigan	Comparative evaluation of corporation laws		
Social Sciences	Law	Joel F. Handler	University of Wisconsin	Social movements and the law		
Social Sciences	Law	Sanford H. Kadish	University of California, Berkeley	Blame in criminal accountability for actions and consequences		
Social Sciences	Political Science	Walter Dean Burnham	Massachusetts Institute of Technology	Pressures of political stability in Great Britain and the US		
Social Sciences	Political Science	Harry Eckstein	Princeton University	Comparative study on the bases of support for governments		
Social Sciences	Political Science	Richard N. Gardner	Columbia University	Strategies for the development of international organization, 1975-2000		
Social Sciences	Political Science	Barbara Hinckley	University of Wisconsin	Coalition theory and Congress		
Social Sciences	Political Science	Raymond F. Hopkins	Swarthmore College	Internationalization of domestic bureaucracies		
Social Sciences	Political Science	Francis G. Hutchins	Institute for Advanced Study	Law and enforcement in India		
Social Sciences	Political Science	George A. Kelly	Brandeis University	Political theory of the French revolutionary terror		
Social Sciences	Political Science	John F. Manley	Stanford University	The Conservative coalition in Congress, 1933-1972		
Social Sciences	Political Science	J. Austin Ranney	University of Wisconsin	American modes of political action, 1776-1976		
Social Sciences	Political Science	Alfred C. Stepan	Yale University	State and society in Latin American politics		
Social Sciences	Political Science	Michael A. Weinstein	Purdue University	Problems citizens face in maintaining freedom in modern society		
Social Sciences	Political Science	Eugene Victor Wolfenstein	University of California, Los Angeles	Woody Guthrie, the American Left, and the transformation of American Society, 1912-1952		
Social Sciences	Psychology	Allan M. Collins	Bolt, Beranek, and Newman, Inc.	Semantic theory and its implications for education		
Social Sciences	Psychology	Susan M. Ervin-Tripp	University of California, Berkeley	Developmental psycholinguistics		
Social Sciences	Psychology	Howard E. Gruber	Rutgers University	Developmental study of Jean Piaget's scientific thought		
Social Sciences	Psychology	Eliot S. Hearst	Indiana University	Analysis of learning and behavioral change		
Social Sciences	Psychology	Tracy S. Kendler	University of California, Santa Barbara	Theory of developmental changes in learning processes		
Social Sciences	Psychology	Bibb Latané	Ohio State University			
Social Sciences	Psychology	Milton J. Rosenberg	University of Chicago			
Social Sciences	Psychology	Albert Rothenberg	Yale University School of Medicine	Creative processes in art and science		
Social Sciences	Psychology	Martin E. P. Seligman	University of Pennsylvania	Mechanism of phobias		
Social Sciences	Psychology	Harris P. Zeigler	Hunter College			
Social Sciences	Sociology	Thomas J. Cottle	Children's Defense Fund of the Washington Research Project			
Social Sciences	Sociology	Diana Crane	University of Pennsylvania	Sociology of culture		
Social Sciences	Sociology	Jack D. Douglas	University of California, San Diego			
Social Sciences	Sociology	Paul Hollander	University of Massachusetts, Amherst			
Social Sciences	Sociology	Richard Robbins	University of Massachusetts, Boston	Biography on Charles S. Johnson		
Social Sciences	Sociology	Leo F. Schnore	University of Wisconsin	Quantitative studies in urban history		
Social Sciences	Sociology	R. Stephen Warner	Yale University	"An inventory and reformulation of values and consensus in sociological theory and empirical research"		
Social Sciences	Sociology	Robert Francis Winch			Also won in 1955	

== Latin American and Caribbean Fellows ==
Category	Field of Study	Fellow	Institutional association	Research topic	Notes	Ref
Creative Arts	Drama and Performance Arts	Juan José Gurrola Iturriaga	National Autonomous University of Mexico	Writing		
Creative Arts	Fiction	José Francisco S. Bianco		Writing		
Creative Arts	Fiction	Alfredo Bryce Echenique		Writing		
Creative Arts	Film	Norma Bahia Pontes		Purchased film equipment for her video series Living in New York City		
Creative Arts	Fine Arts	Miguel Condé		Drawing and etching; 15-part series: Guggenheim Suite		
Creative Arts	Fine Arts	Manuel Felguérez		Research at Harvard		
Creative Arts	Fine Arts	Mario Toral		Painting		
Creative Arts	Poetry	Javier Sologuren		Writing		
Humanities	Economic History	Pablo Macera	National University of San Marcos			
Humanities	Economic History	Claudio Véliz	La Trobe University	Economic and social history of Chile		
Humanities	General Nonfiction	Humberto Díaz Casanueva		Wrote Memorias		
Humanities	Philosophy	Risieri Frondizi	Southern Illinois University	Value theory		
Humanities	Philosophy	Roberto Torretti	University of Puerto Rico	Partially dedicated to writing Philosophy of Geometry from Riemann to Poincaré (published 1978)	Also won in 1980	
Humanities	Spanish & Portuguese Literature	Josep M. Solá-Solé	Catholic University of America	Structural relationship between Hebraic poetry and the poetry of Spain in the early Middle Ages	Also won in 1967	
Natural Science	Earth Science	Héctor L. D'Antoni	NASA Ames Research Center			
Natural Science	Earth Science	Alberto Carlos Riccardi	Argentine National Research Council			
Natural Science	Earth Science	Mario Vergara Martínez	University of Chile			
Natural Science	Mathematics	Neantro Saavedra Rivano	Simón Bolívar University	Article: Finite Geometries in the Theory of Theta Characteristics (1976)		
Natural Science	Medicine and Health	Marcelino Cereijido	Instituto Politécnico Nacional	Work with David M. Sabatini on culturing MDCK cells		
Natural Science	Molecular and Cellular Biology	Mario Suwalsky	University of Concepción			
Natural Science	Neuroscience	Juan H. Fernández	University of Chile			
Natural Science	Organismic Biology and Ecology	Juan Alberto Schnack	Argentine National Research Council			
Natural Science	Physics	Erasmo Ferreira	Federal University of Rio de Janeiro			
Natural Science	Physics	Luiz C. M. Miranda	Instituto Tecnológico de Aeronáutica	Research at the University of Arizona		
Natural Science	Plant Science	Clodomiro Marticorena	University of Concepción	Botany research at National Museum of Natural History		
Natural Science	Plant Science	Elías Ramón de la Sota			Also won in 1962	
Social Science	Anthropology and Cultural Studies	René Acuña-Sandoval	National Autonomous University of Mexico		Also won in 1983	
Social Science	Anthropology and Cultural Studies	Augusto Ricardo Cardich	National University of La Plata			
Social Science	Psychology	Lea Baider	Tel HaShomer Hospital			
Social Science	Psychology	Celia Jakubowicz	University of Paris V			

== See also ==
- John Simon Guggenheim Memorial Foundation
- List of Guggenheim Fellowships awarded in 1973
- List of Guggenheim Fellowships awarded in 1975
