= McHale =

McHale or MacHale is a surname of Irish origin. It refers to:

Persons

- Brian McHale (b. 1952), American literary theorist and author
- Brian K. McHale (b. 1954), American politician from Maryland
- Christina McHale (b. 1992), American tennis player
- D. J. MacHale (b. 1956), US-American writer, director, and executive producer
- Des MacHale (b. 1950), associate professor of Mathematics at University College Cork, Ireland
- Evelyn McHale (1923–1947), American bookkeeper, subject of an iconic photograph showing her body after she jumped from an observation platform of the Empire State Building
- Gary McHale (contemporary), Canadian protest organizer
- James McHale, Western Australian journalist
- Jim McHale (1875–1959), American professional baseball player
- Jock McHale (1882–1953), Australian rules football player and coach
- Joe McHale (b. 1963), American football linebacker
- Joel McHale (b. 1971), American television show host, comedian, and actor
- John MacHale (1791–1891), Irish Roman Catholic archbishop and Irish nationalist
- John McHale (1922–1978), Scottish-American artist
- John McHale (1921–2008), American professional baseball player and manager
- Judith McHale, American executive
- Kevin McHale (b. 1939), English professional football player
- Kevin McHale (b. 1957), American professional basketball player
- Kevin Michael McHale (b. 1988), American actor and singer
- Marty McHale (1886–1979), American professional baseball player
- Patrick McHale (1826–1866), Irish recipient of the Victoria Cross
- Patrick McHale (b. 1983), American animator
- Paul McHale (b. 1981), Scottish professional football player
- Paul F. McHale, Jr. (b. 1950), American politician from Pennsylvania
- Ray McHale (b. 1950), English professional football player
- Seán MacHale (1936–2023), Irish rugby union player
- Sean McHale (b. 2005), Irish footballer
- Sheila McHale (contemporary), English-Australian politician from Western Australia
- Tom McHale (b. 1902), American novelist from Iowa
- Tom McHale (1941–1983), American novelist from Pennsylvania
- Tom McHale (1963–2008), American professional football player
- Tommy McHale, English professional footballer
- Tony McHale (contemporary), British actor, writer, and director

Fictional Characters

- Lieutenant Commander Quinton McHale, title character of the American television series McHale's Navy

Other

- McHale (farm machinery), machine manufacturer
