= Tom McHale =

Tom McHale may refer to:

- Tom McHale (novelist, born 1902) (1902–1994), American novelist from Iowa
- Tom McHale (novelist, born 1941) (1941–1982), American novelist from Pennsylvania
- Tom McHale (American football) (1963–2008), offensive guard
- Tommy McHale, English footballer for Bradford City
