= Doob =

Doob may refer to:

- Doob (album), solo album by Arnob, 2008
- Anthony Doob (born 1943), Canadian criminologist, son of Leonard
- Joseph L. Doob (1910–2004), American mathematician
- Leonard W. Doob (1909–2000), American academic working in the fields of cognitive and social psychology, propaganda and communication studies
