= Wright's Automatic Machinery Company =

Historic industrial building in North Carolina, US

- U.S. National Register of Historic Places
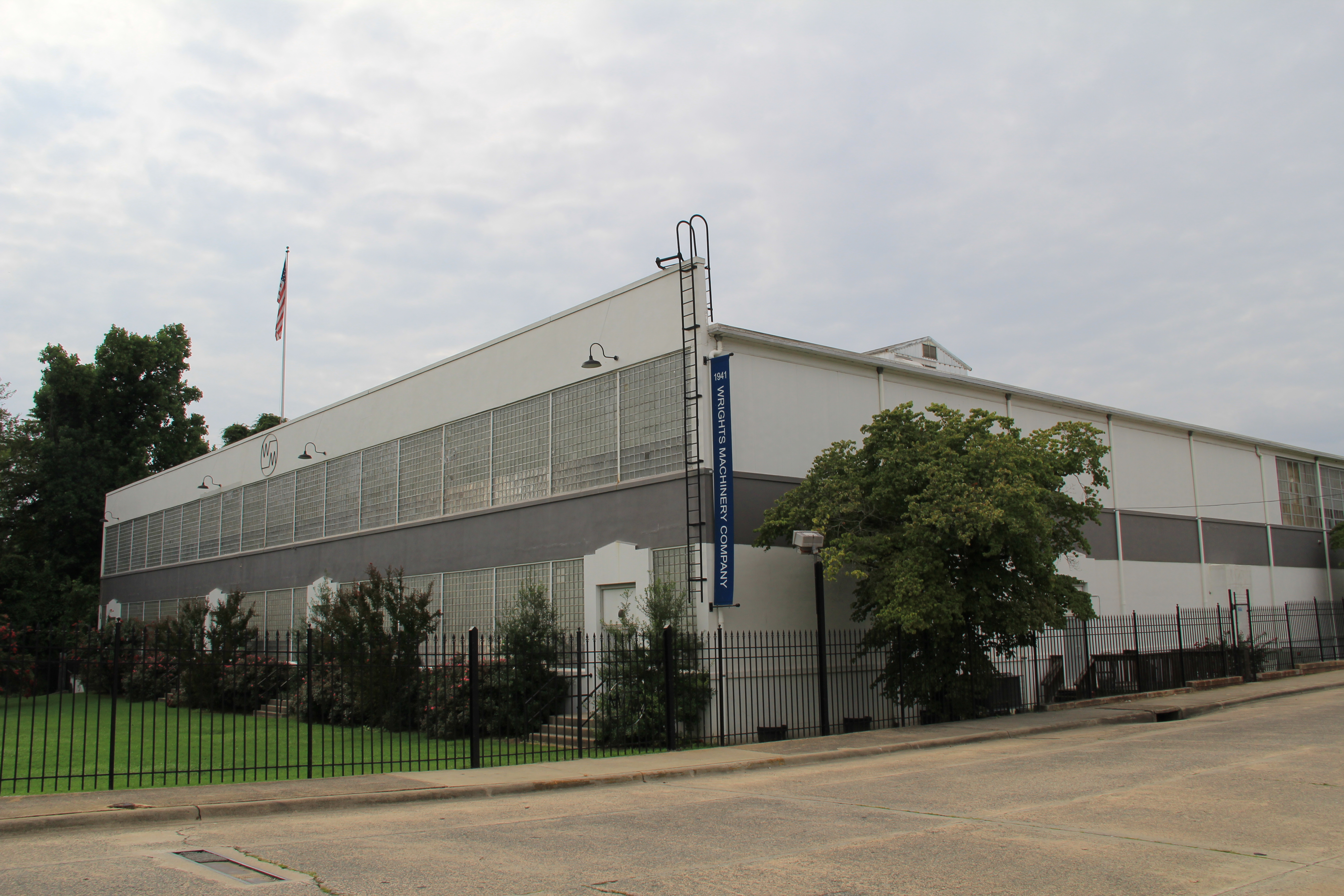
- Wright's Machinery Company, August 2014

- Location within North Carolina Location within the United States
- Location: 915 Holloway St., Durham, North Carolina
- Coordinates: 35°59′42″N 78°53′04″W
- Area: .397 acres (0.161 ha)
- Built: 1942
- Built by: C. C. Woods Construction Company
- Architects: Atwood and Weeks
- Architectural style: Modern Movement
- NRHP reference No.: 12001088
- Added to NRHP: December 26, 2012

Wright's Automatic Machinery Company, also known as Wright Machinery Company and Wright's Automatic Tobacco Packing Machine Company, is a historic machine factory located at Durham, North Carolina.

== History ==
It was built in 1942, and is a two-story, square, modern architecture style, stuccoed brick factory building. It features a wide ribbon of glass block underscored by a continuous concrete sill stretches across the facade at each story and recessed double-leaf entrances set into cast-concrete peaked surrounds.

== Construction ==
The building was constructed by the Defense Plant Corporation during World War II to support the manufacturing of gunfire control equipment for the United States Navy.

Later it was used to build precision instruments here for the U. S. military and later for the National Aeronautics and Space Administration. It was listed on the National Register of Historic Places in 2012.

== See also ==
- McHale (farm machinery)
- Clark Equipment Company
