= Douglas Sloan =

Douglas Sloan may refer to:

- Douglas Sloan (filmmaker), American documentary filmmaker
- Douglas M. Sloan, professor of history and education at Teachers College, Columbia University
