= Defense Plant Corporation =

World War II Federal Government Program

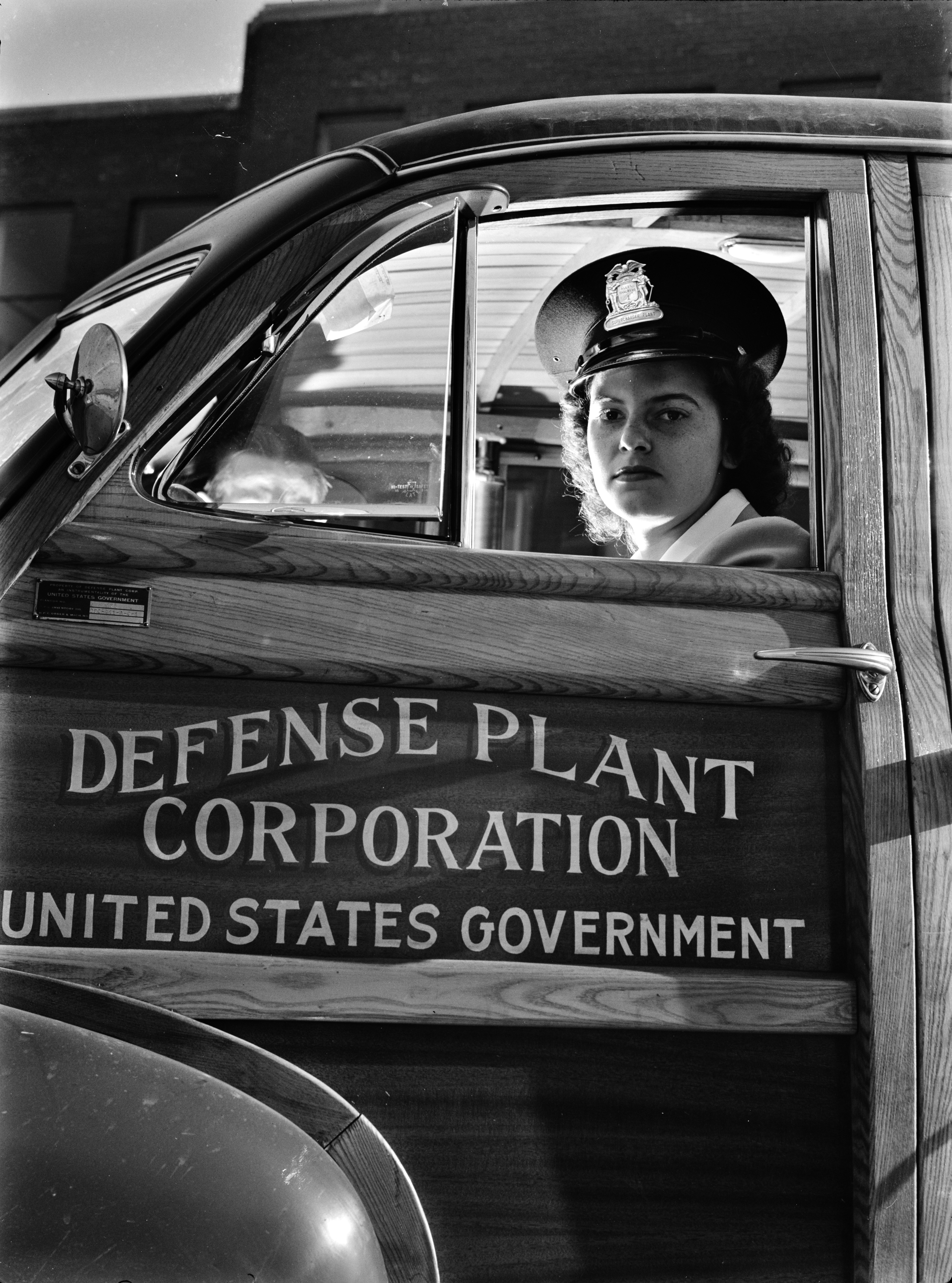
- A young shuttle driver at the Allis-Chalmers Supercharger plant in Milwaukee (October 1942)
- Type: State-owned enterprise
- Industry: Financial services
- Founded: 1940
- Founder: Government of the United States
- Defunct: 1945
- Fate: Closed as no longer needed after the end of World War II
- Headquarters: Washington, DC, United States of America
- Area served: United States
- Products: War production loans
- Parent: Reconstruction Finance Corporation

The Defense Plant Corporation (DPC), was an American subsidiary of the Reconstruction Finance Corporation, a government corporation run by the United States federal government between 1940 and 1945. To win World War II the United States and its Allied Nations needed massive war production. Many private companies did not have the capital funds to meet the wartime demand for buildings and equipment.

Defense Plant Corporation provided financial support to state and local governments. Defense Plant Corporation also made loans to banks, railroads, mortgage associations, and other businesses supporting the war efforts.

== History ==
The Reconstruction Finance Corporation (RFC) was founded in 1932 by Herbert Hoover to help with the Great Depression; with the outbreak of World War II it became a war department. Fund requests usually started with the United States Navy, United States Army, War Shipping Administration, Office of Production Management, the War Production Board, Maritime Commission or other war departments. The Reconstruction Finance Corporation had eight subsidiaries. Most requests for new factories and new mills were given to the Defense Plant Corporation. The head of the Defense Plant Corporation was Jesse H. Jones, with Emil Schram and Sam Husbands. It would also offer oversight that factories were constructed, equipped, and operated. By the time it closed in 1945 it had funded over $9 billion into the wartime factories. The funds went to over 2,300 projects in 46 US states and in foreign countries. In most projects, the government owned factories and leased them to private companies. Major factories built were aircraft manufacturing (50% of funds), tanks plants, nonferrous metals, machine tools, synthetic rubber, shipyards and boat yards. The largest project was $176 million for Dodge's Chicago aircraft engine plant. The Dodge Chicago Plant manufactured engines for the Boeing B-29 Superfortress and Consolidated B-32 Dominator. The Dodge Chicago 1,545 acres with a steel forge and aluminum foundry. With the end of the war, the DPC ceased operations on July 1, 1945.

== Funded ==
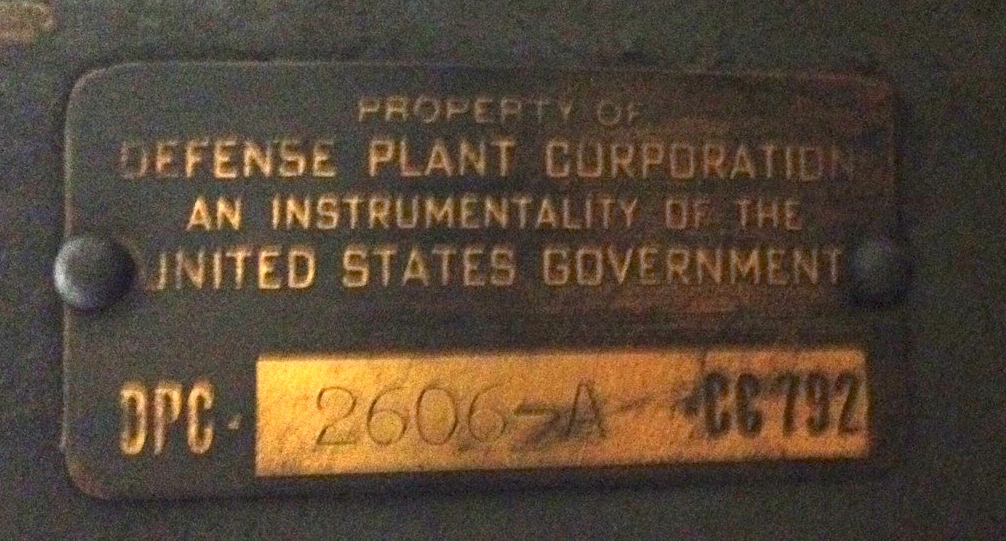
Defense Plant Corporation motor nameplate

Some companies funded:

- Ben's Original
- Citgo to funded synthetic rubber
- Willow Run
- Sangamon Ordnance Plant
- EMD Model 40 plant
- Homestead Steel Works
- Southwest Power Pool
- Wright's Automatic Machinery Company
- Contract Flying School Airfields
- General Motors's Central Foundry Division and other plants
- Big Inch
- Baldwin Locomotive Works
- Holston Army Ammunition Plant
- U.S. Steel Duquesne Works and Homestead Works

== See also ==
- Resolution Trust Corporation
- Federal Emergency Management Agency
- Emergency Relief and Construction Act
