= Julian Szekely =

Hungarian-American materials scientist (1934–1995)

- Born: November 23, 1934; Budapest, Hungary
- Died: December 7, 1995 (aged 61); Weston, Massachusetts
- Education: Imperial College London
- Awards: Beilby Medal and Prize (1973); Guggenheim Fellowship (1974); US National Academy of Engineering (1982)
- Scientific career
- Fields: Materials science & engineering
- Workplaces: Massachusetts Institute of Technology; University at Buffalo; Imperial College London
- Doctoral advisor: John Francis Richardson

Julian Szekely (November 23, 1934 – December 7, 1995) was a Hungarian-American chemical engineer and materials scientist. He was a professor of materials science and engineering at the Massachusetts Institute of Technology.

Born in Budapest, Hungary, Szekely received both his BSc (1959) and PhD (1961) in chemical engineering from Imperial College London. He moved to the United States in 1966, becoming a US citizen in 1972.
