= Lea Baider =

Professor of medical psychology

Lea Baider (born 1939), is a professor of medical psychology, and considered one of the founders of psycho-oncology. She is the director of psycho-oncology at the Sharsheret Institute of Oncology at the Hadassah Medical Center in Jerusalem. Baider is also a member of the Middle East Cancer Consortium. Baider runs workshops in psycho-oncology to expand the field.

== Education ==
Baider was born and raised in Buenos Aires, Argentina. She graduated with a B.A in education 1957 from the University of Buenos Aires. In 1963, she graduated from with a M.A in clinical psychology from the University of Buenos Aires. Between 1967 and 1968, she was a research fellow at Tufts University and at Harvard University. In 1973, she earned her Ph.D. from Brandeis University, where she wrote her dissertation: Family Structure and the Process of Dying: A Study of Cancer Patients and their Family Interaction.

== Career ==
Baider started her career as a consulting psychologist in at Boston University Medical Center. She then became a clinical psychologist in the oncology department of Shattuck Hospital, while running group therapy for drug-addiction at Boston University Medical Center. She then became the supervisor for Boston University Medical Center's "family therapy training program". She then moved to Israel and became a postdoctoral fellow at the Tel Aviv University Medical Center in Family Medicine.

=== Psycho-oncology ===
In 1982, Baider built the psycho-oncology department at the Hadassah Medical Center in Jerusalem. In 2012, she established the psycho-oncology department in Assuta Medical Center located in Tel Aviv. She is a past president of the international psycho-oncology society. In May 2015, Baider participated in a workshop teaching doctors about psycho-oncology at the Sacred Heart training center. In 2018, she ran another workshop at Babes University. She continues to practice psycho-oncology by giving support to women support through treatment and recovery of breast cancer.

As of February 2018, Baider continues to run workshops about psycho-oncology, training others to practice it as well.

== Publications and awards ==
Baider has received Arthur Sutherland memorial award for psycho-oncology. In 1974, she was awarded a Guggenheim Latin America and Caribbean Fellowship for psychology. She wrote a book called Cancer and Family, and released a second edition of the book. She has also published around 200 articles in scientific journals like The Oncologist and Future of Medicine. She also helped with research on behalf of Multi-international Association of supportive care in cancer. There she helped review research on the 6th vital sign.

=== Cancer and the Family ===
One of her more notorious publications was her book Cancer and the Family. The book is about how cancer affects the family dynamic, as well as each member of the family. It discusses how children react to cancer and new clinical information on the role family plays in cancer and cancer treatment and recovery.
