= Penelope Reed Doob =

American scholar

Penelope Billings Reed Doob (August 13, 1943 — March 11, 2017) was an American-born Canadian medievalist, dance scholar, and medical researcher. She was awarded a Guggenheim Fellowship in 1974 for her research on medieval literature.

== Early life ==
Penelope Billings Reed was born in Rhode Island in 1943, the daughter of Thomas Lloyd Reed (an art history professor) and Betsy Mook Reed. She attended the Lincoln School in Providence. She studied English literature at Harvard University as an undergraduate, but also considered a medical career; she was awarded a National Science Foundation Medical Research Fellowship in 1964. She completed doctoral studies in 1969 at Stanford University, with a dissertation that became her first book, Nebuchadnezzar's Children: Conventions of Madness in Medieval Literature (1974).

== Career ==
Doob was a professor of dance, English literature, and women's studies at York University. She was chair of the dance department at York from 2001 to 2006, and served as associate principal of the university's Glendon College. Later books by Doob included The Idea of the Labyrinth from the Classical Period through the Middle Ages (1990); and, with Charlotte Morse and Marjorie Woods, The Uses of Manuscripts in Literary Studies. She collaborated with dancer Karen Kain on writing her memoir, Movement Never Lies (1994). She was awarded a Guggenheim Fellowship in 1974 for her research on medieval English literature.

Doob conducted interviews on dance for CBC Radio from 1976 to 1979, and wrote program notes for the National Ballet of Canada. She was also a founding president of Reed McFadden, a medical research company, and was a research associate at Toronto Western Hospital. She served on the board of Camp Pemigewassett in New Hampshire, founded by her grandfather. She helped to produce the camp's annual Gilbert and Sullivan show. She served on the board of directors for the Actors' Fund of Canada (1993-2006) and was active with the World Dance Alliance (2001-2009).

== Personal life ==
Penelope Reed married twice. She married Anthony Doob, a criminologist, in 1966, and law professor Graham Parker in 1985. Both marriages ended in divorce. Penelope Reed Doob retired from York University in 2014 and died in 2017, after many years with Parkinson's disease. She was 73 years old. Flags at York University were lowered to half-mast at news of her death.
