= Susan Lowey =

Susan Lowey (born 22 January 1933 in Vienna) is an American biophysicist researching the structure and function of contractile proteins. She currently teaches in the Department of Molecular Physiology & Biophysics at the University of Vermont and is a fellow of the American Academy of Arts and Sciences as well as the Biophysical Society.

== Education ==
Lowey received her BA from Barnard College, PhD in Physical Chemistry from Yale University and pursued post-doctoral research at Harvard University on the biochemistry and structure of myosin, a protein involved in muscle contraction.

== Career ==
Lowey was employed for about a decade at the Children's Cancer Research Foundation and Harvard Medical School. In 1972, Lowey became a faculty member at The Rosenstiel Basic Medical Sciences Research Center, Brandeis University to collaborate with biophysicists. In 1998, Lowey was appointed as a faculty member in the Department of Molecular Physiology & Biophysics at the University of Vermont.

== Awards and recognitions ==
- 1974 Guggenheim Fellowship for Natural Science Recipient.
- 1990 Lowey was elected as fellow to the American Academy of Arts and Sciences.
- 1999 Lowey became a fellow of the Biophysical Society.

== See also ==
- List of Guggenheim Fellowships awarded in 1974
