= EMD Model 40 =

Industrial diesel-electric switcher locomotive

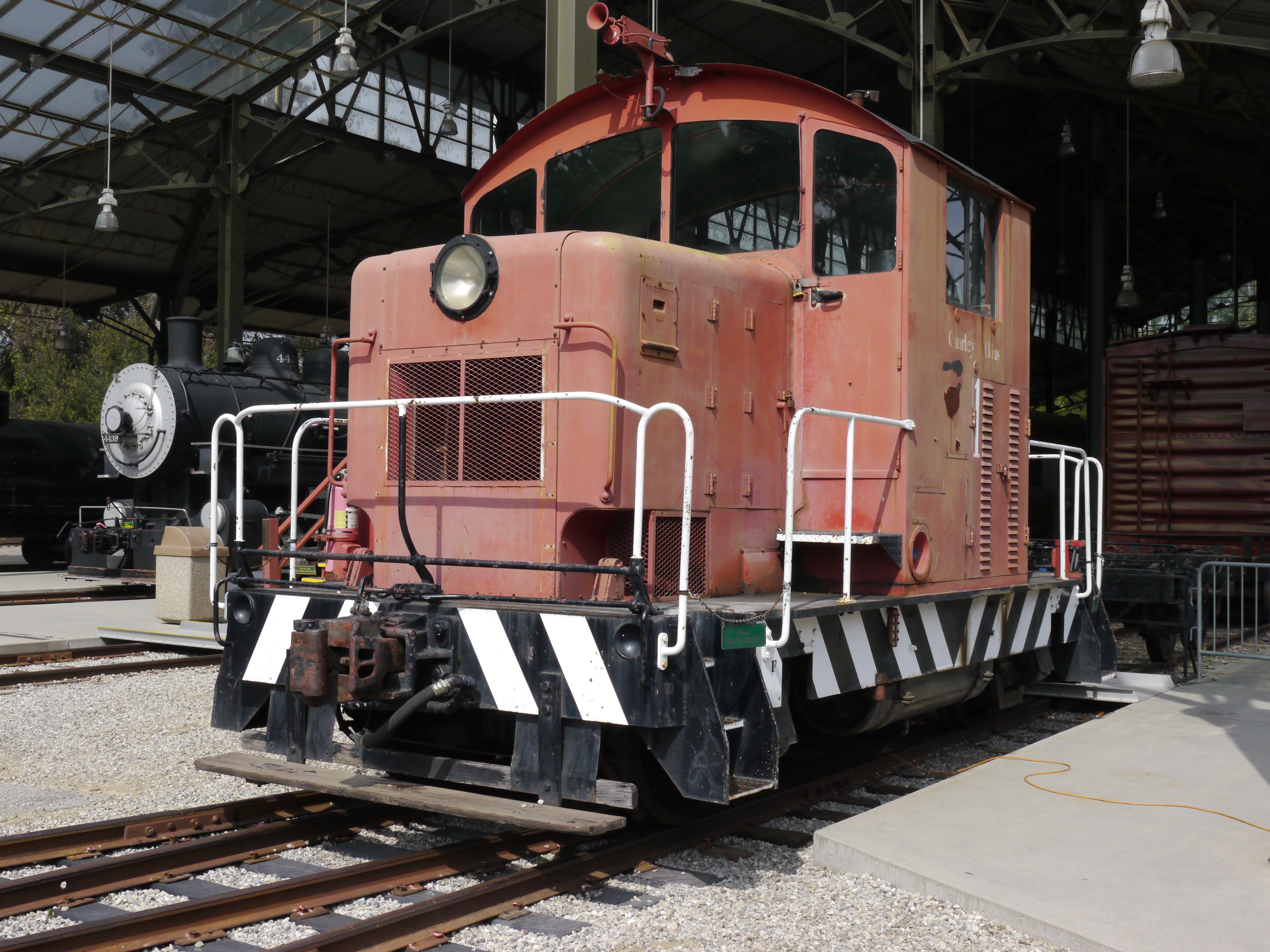
- An EMD Model 40 at the Travel Town Museum in Los Angeles, California
Type and origin
- Power type: Diesel-electric
- Designer: Electro-Motive Corporation (EMC)
- Builder: General Motors Electro-Motive Division (EMD)
- Model: Model 40
- Build date: August 1940 – April 1943
- Total produced: 11
Specifications
- Configuration
  - Whyte: 4wDE
  - AAR: B
  - UIC: Bo
- Gauge: 4 ft 8 1/2 in (1,435 mm) standard gauge
- Wheel diameter: 45 in (1,143.0 mm)
- Wheelbase: 13 ft (4.0 m)
- Length: 26 ft 1 in (7.95 m)
- Height: 13 ft 2.5 in (4.03 m)
- Loco weight: 82,000 lb (37,000 kg)
- Fuel type: Diesel
- Prime mover: (2) Detroit Diesel D71
- Engine type: Inline 6-cylinder two-stroke diesel engine
- Aspiration: Naturally aspirated
- Displacement: 426 cu in (6,981 cc) per engine
- Generator: EMD D7
- Traction motors: (2) EMD DC
- Cylinders: (2) 6
- Cylinder size: 4.25 in × 5 in (108 mm × 127 mm) (bore × stroke)
- Transmission: Diesel-electric, direct current
- Loco brake: Westinghouse 14-EL air brake
- Couplers: Janney (AAR)
Performance figures
- Maximum speed: 30 mph (48.3 km/h)
- Power output: Total: 300 hp (223.7 kW); Per engine: 150 hp (111.9 kW)
Career
- Nicknames: Critters
- Locale: North America

The EMD Model 40 was a two-axle diesel-electric switcher locomotive built by Electro-Motive Corporation (EMC), and its corporate successor, General Motors' Electro-Motive Division (EMD) between August 1940 and April 1943. Nicknamed "critters", eleven examples of this locomotive were built. Powered by twin General Motors Detroit Diesel 6-71 diesel engines, which produce a combined 300 horsepower (224 kW), its drivetrain is unusual because the two diesel engines are used to drive the electric DC generator from both sides, one with clockwise rotation and the other with counter-clockwise rotation.

Original buyers for the Model 40 included the Electro-Motive Corporation/Electro-Motive Diesel Plant, 1 unit (used as the #2 plant switcher), Defense Plant Corporation, 4 units, the United States Army, 3 units, the United States Navy, 2 units, and the General Motors Cleveland Diesel Division, 1 unit.

== Roster of locomotives ==
- s/n 1134: Built as EMC 1134 (demonstrator), to McKinnon Industries (GM Canada), to Andrew Merrilees, later sold to Devco Railway #20, retired to Museum of Industry, Stellarton, Nova Scotia (currently stored out of public display).
- s/n 1308: Built for Defence Plant Corp. (Des Moines, IA), to Old Ben Coal (on site before 1956), purchased by Precision Engineering for parts (around 1968), scrapped.
- s/n 1309: Built for US Rubber, to Penn Dixie Cement, to North American Coal Company Indianhead Mine (Zap, ND), to SunPrairie Cooperative (Mohall, ND), retired to Lake Superior Railroad Museum at Duluth, Minnesota.
- s/n 1834: Built as USAX 7403, deemed surplus at the end of 1946 and sold to Buffalo Slag. Later sold to Cushing Stone Company of Amsterdam, New York (still on property, operational into the 1990s)
- s/n 1835: Built as DPC #2, to American Steel Foundry 51, to Lipsett Steel Foundries, to Calumet Steel, donated to Hoosier Valley Railroad Museum in North Judson, Indiana
- s/n 2284: Built as USAX 7952, to Acme Newport Steel, Newport, KY as NPTX #1. Owned and restored by Professional Locomotive Services in East Chicago, Indiana
- s/n 2285: Built as USAX 7953, to Gulf South Terminal Warehousing (somewhere between 1946 and 1949), to American Creosote Works (acquired 1950–56), resold to Coastal Sand & Gravel (Lacombe, LA); operation abandoned by the 1980s, hulk of engine still on site.
- s/n 2286 Built as USAX 7954, to Sanderson & Porter Construction (contractors for West Penn Power), moved to West Penn Power - Mitchell Plant, transferred to West Penn Springdale Station, to Hagerstown Roundhouse Museum, leased to Walkersville Southern Railroad, Walkersville, Maryland.
- s/n 2287 Built as USN #4, used during WWII by the Naval Ordinance Plant in York, PA. Remained on site, transferred to the American Machine and Foundry Company (AMF) and subsequently Harley-Davidson. Now on display at the York County History Center's Agricultural and Industrial Museum in York, Pennsylvania.
- s/n 2288 Built as USN #56-00323, to Douglas Aircraft Industrial Reserve Plant (later McDonnell Douglas), retired to Travel Town Museum, Los Angeles, California.
- s/n 2289 Built as GM Cleveland (unknown number), transferred to GM-EMD South Chicago Plant 2, out of use by mid 1970s, scrapped.

== Gallery ==
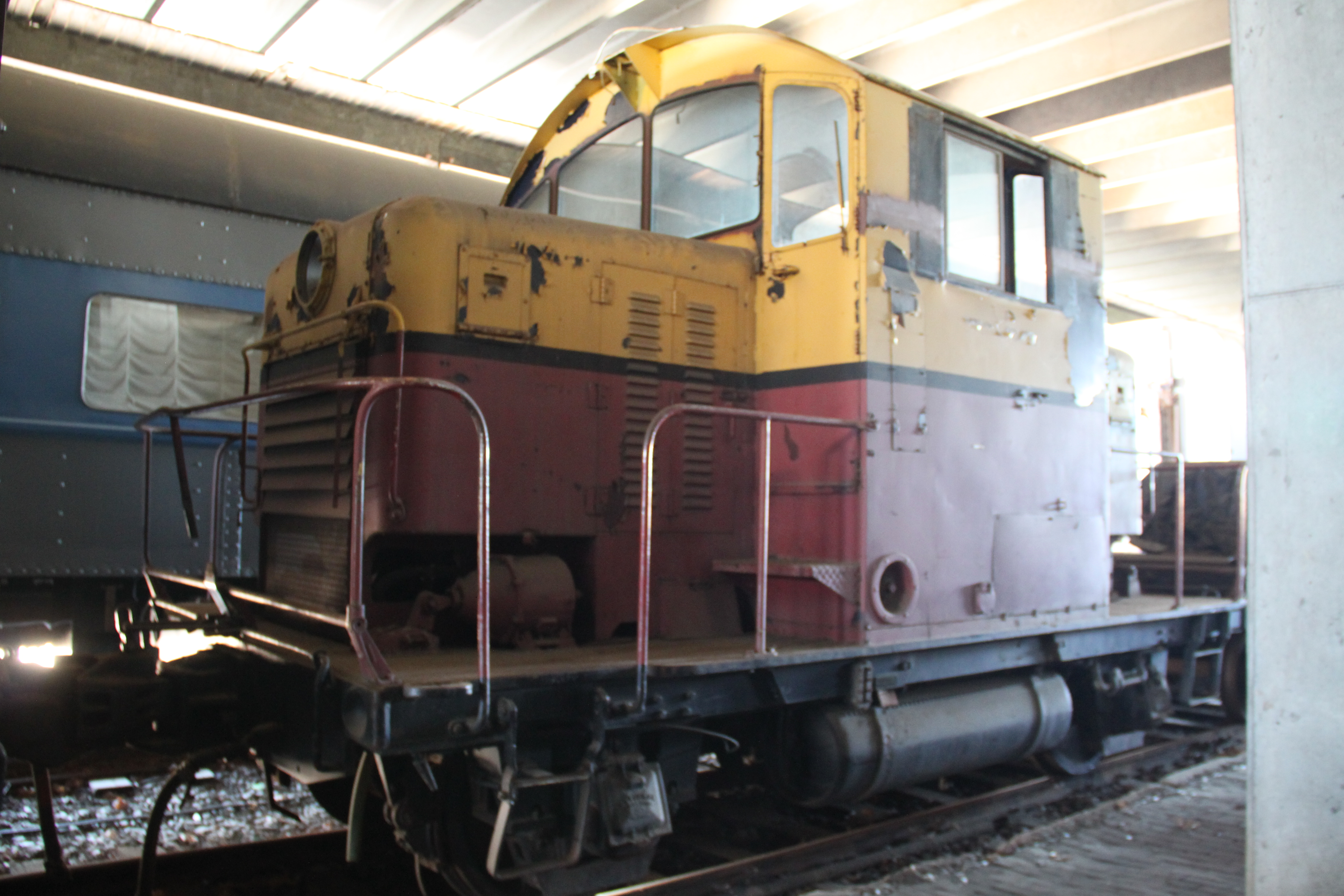
EMD #1309 at the Lake Superior Railroad Museum

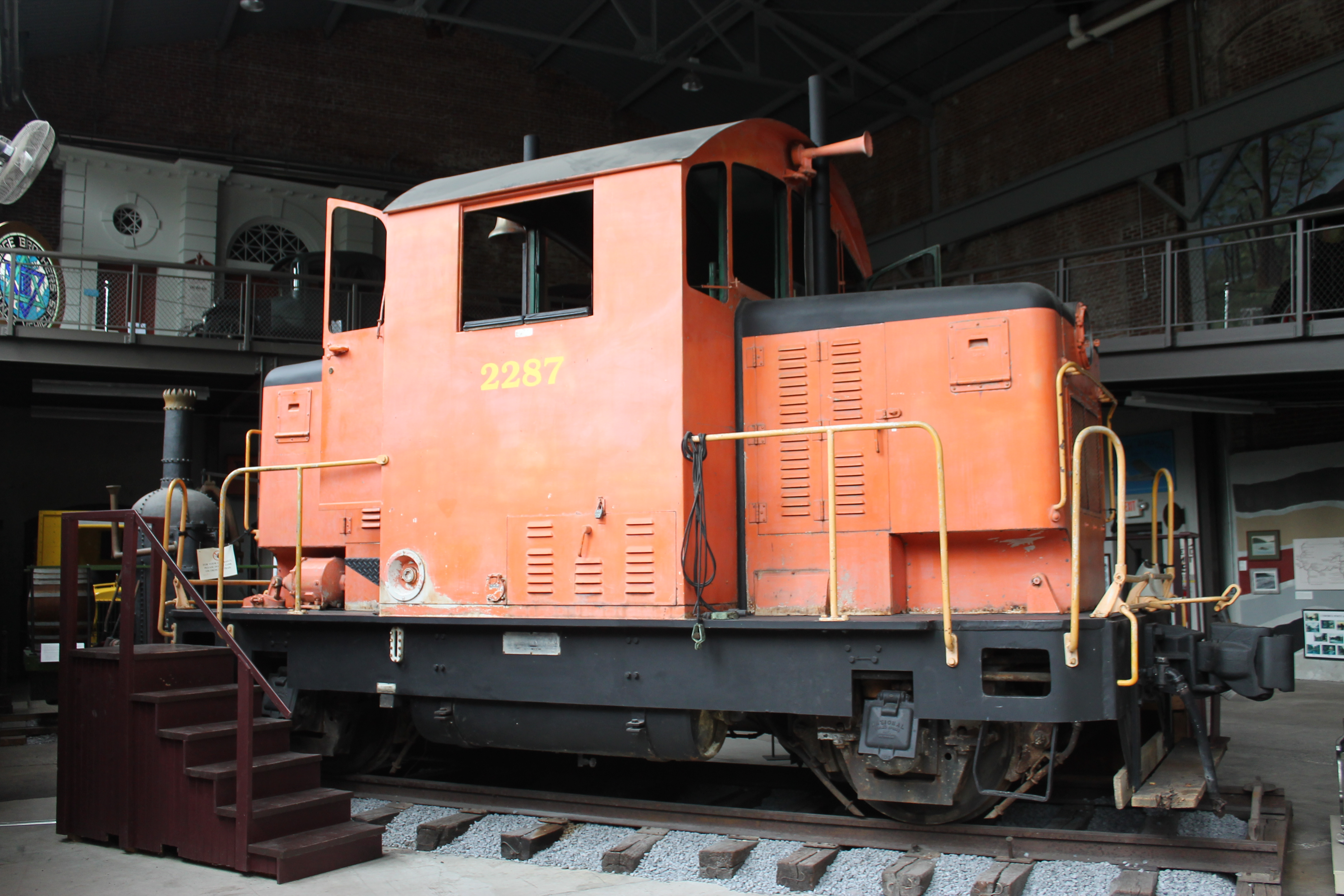
EMD #2287 on display at the York County History Center's Agricultural and Industrial Museum

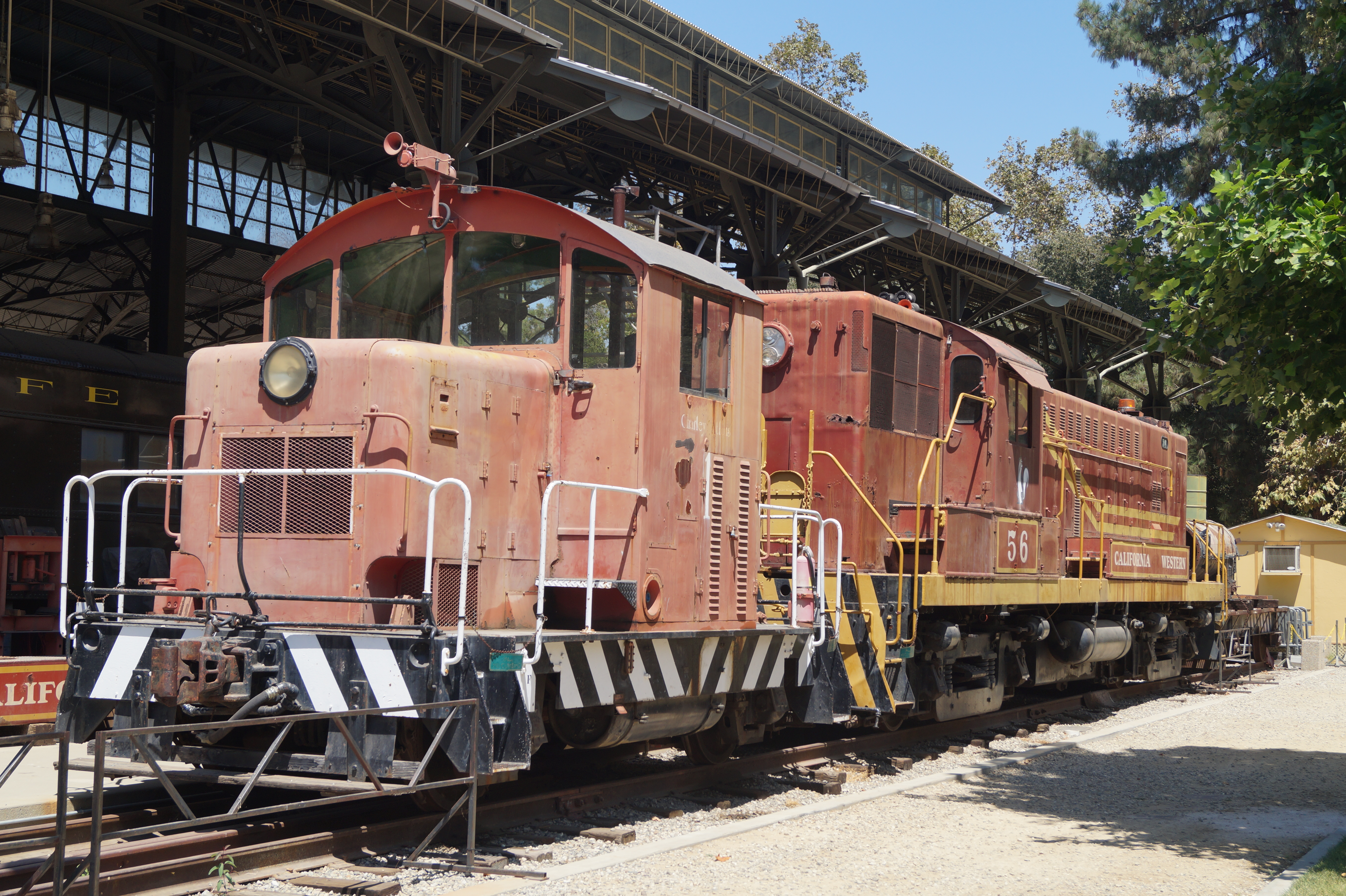
EMD #2288 at the Travel Town Museum
