= Irma Gigli =

Imunologist

Irma Gigli (born 1931) is an emeritus professor at the University of Texas Health Science Center at Houston, and the Walter & Mary Mischer Distinguished Professor in Molecular Medicine, Hans J. Müller-Eberhard Chair in Immunology, and Director Emeritus of the IMM Center for Immunology & Autoimmune Diseases.

== Early life and education ==
Gigli was born in Cordoba, Argentina on December 22, 1931. She earned a teaching certification in 1948, and a bachelor's degree in 1950 from Colegio Nacional Manuel Balgrano in Buenos Aires. She studied medicine and taught biochemistry at the National University of Córdoba, graduating with an MD in 1957.

== Career ==
In 1957, Gigli moved to the United States and did an internship in internal medicine and residency in dermatology at Cook County Hospital in Chicago, Illinois from 1957 to 1960. She spent a year doing research at New York University, then moved to the Howard Hughes Medical Institute in Miami, Florida. There she spent three years doing research in immunology. She moved to Germany to spend two years doing research at the University of Frankfurt, before moving back to the United States. She then joined the faculty at Harvard Medical School, where she worked until 1976.

In 1976, she spent a year at Oxford University as a visiting scientist in biochemistry. She returned to the United States and became a professor of dermatology and experimental medicine at New York University.

From 1983 to 1995, Gigli was the chief of the division of dermatology at UC San Diego. She then moved to the University of Texas Health Science Center at Houston, where she was a professor of medicine and dermatology and vice-chair of medical sciences. In 1995, she and her husband founded the Brown Foundation Institute of Molecular Medicine Center for the Prevention of Human Diseases at UT Houston, and she served as deputy director. While at UT Houston, she also held the positions of Walter & Mary Mischer Distinguished Professor in Molecular Medicine, director of the Center for Immunology and Autoimmune Diseases, and the Hans J. Müller-Eberhard Chair in Immunology.

She served on the Board of Scientific Counselors of the National Institute of Allergy and Infectious Diseases and on the Board of Directors of the US Civilian Research and Development Foundation.

== Personal life ==
Gigli married Hans J. Müller-Eberhard, a German physician and immunologist who died of cancer in 1998, and has two daughters.

== Awards ==
- 1972 Elected to the American Society for Clinical Investigation
- 1974 John Simon Guggenheim Fellow
- 2003 Distinguished Professional Woman of the Year Award from UT Houston
- Elected to the National Academy of Medicine
- Elected to the American Academy of Arts and Sciences
