= Celia Jakubowicz =

Argentine psychologist (1939-2008)

- Born: 4 March 1939; Buenos Aires, Argentina
- Died: 10 January 2008 (aged 68); Paris, France
- Occupation: Psychologist
- Awards: Guggenheim Fellowship (1973)

Academic background
- Education: University of Buenos Aires (licentiate); University of Paris (doctorate)
- Thesis: La compréhension des phrases négatives (1971)

Academic work
- Sub-discipline: Psycholinguistics
- Institutions: University of Buenos Aires; Laboratoire de psychologie expérimentale

Celia Jakubowicz de Matzkin (4 March 1939 – 10 January 2008) was an Argentine psychologist. After studying abroad in France and obtaining a doctorate there, she co-directed both the Institute for Research in Epistomology and Psychology and the Interdisciplinary Center for Research and Teaching before fleeing the country due to the 1976 Argentine coup d'état. A 1973 Guggenheim Fellow, she specialized in psycholinguistics.

== Biography ==
Jakubowicz was born on 4 March 1939 in Buenos Aires. She obtained a licentiate in psychology from the University of Buenos Aires in 1963 or 1964; she also worked as a teaching assistant in psychology there.

In 1964, Jakubowicz became a research fellow at the University of Paris's Laboratoire de psychologie expérimentale on a CONICET fellowship, supervised by director Paul Fraisse. In 1967, she became an attaché de recherche at the French National Centre for Scientific Research. In 1971, she obtained a doctorate from Sorbonne; her dissertation, centered on language development, was titled La compréhension des phrases négatives.

Returning to Argentina, Jakubowicz was a co-director of the Institute for Research in Epistomology and Psychology, and co-founded and directed the Interdisciplinary Center for Research and Teaching. She was a professor (Note: Sources differ on whether her title was professor of developmental psychology or professor of genetic psychology and linguistics.) at UBA, and her research and teaching specialized in language acquisition. In 1973, she was awarded a Guggenheim Fellowship "for studies in developmental psycholinguistics".

Following the 1976 Argentine coup d'état, Jakubowicz was fired from UBA and, now in exile, returned to the Laboratoire de psychologie expérimentale, where she helped with research on psycholinguistics and in 1985 started a project on language acquisition. She was invited to the Massachusetts Institute of Technology by Noam Chomsky after the two met the 1980 Entretiens de Royaumont, and was a visiting scholar at MIT from 1981 to 1985. She was later named directeur de recherche emérite. She also supervised doctoral dissertations at Paris Descartes University and Paris 8 University.

In 1995, Jakubowicz started research on specific language impairment in children, with her work involving clinical hospital workers in the Paris area. Dalila Ayoun said that Jakubowicz's "contribution to the study of SLI has been enormous [and her] role in stimulating research on acquisition in France and elsewhere has been decisive". She contributed to the 2008 edited volume Studies in French Applied Linguistics, co-authoring with Laurice Tuller a chapter on language impairment in the first section; Jean Marie Schultz said: "Although the primary goal of the authors' work is to increase the understanding of how language is acquired in impaired children in order to better identify and to help these individuals, their research promises to shed light on how "the mind is organized for language" and, consequently, on the acquisition of French in general."

Jakubowicz wrote a chapter on crosslinguistics in the 1996 edited volume Methods for Assassing Children's Syntax. Tuller called her "instrumental in building bridges between theoretical linguists and experimental psychologists interested in working on language in France".

Jakubowicz died on 10 January 2008 in Paris. Lingua dedicated the third issue of its volume 121 to Jakubowicz, focusing on her field of specific language impairment. Some of her correspondence with Noam Chomsky is archived at his personal archives at MIT.
