= Claudio Véliz =

Chilean historian (born 1930)

- Born: July 21, 1930 (age 96); Viña del Mar, Chile

Academic background
- Education: University of Florida; London School of Economics and Political Science
- Thesis: Arthur Young and the English landed interest 1784-1813 (1959)

Academic work
- Discipline: Economics; Sociology
- Institutions: Boston University; Harvard University; La Trobe University

Claudio Véliz (born 21 July 1930, Viña del Mar, Chile) is an economic historian, sociologist and author from Chile, who has held numerous academic posts in various institutions of higher learning including La Trobe University (Australia), Harvard and Boston University.

== Early life ==
Educated at The Mackay School (Valparaíso, Chile) and the Grange School (Santiago, Chile). A gifted athlete, he competed and won the cross-country and two-mile races, and also trained with the Chilean Ski Team under Emile Allais. In 1950, he completed a Bachelor of Science degree (agricultural economics) in the University of Florida and in 1959, he completed a PhD in Economic History at the London School of Economics with a dissertation on "Arthur Young and the English Landed Interest".

== Life and work ==
Returning to Chile in 1956 to edit the morning tabloid, El Espectador, he soon left this post to teach economic history at the University of Chile while continuing to write for the paper Las Noticias de Ultima Hora, under the pen-name Lautaro Fabian, and for Mensaje, a monthly journal of opinion published by the Jesuit Centro Bellarmino. A year later, he organised the "Lautaro Group", a Chilean version of the British Fabian Society.

In 1960, he was back in London completing archival work at the Public Record Office and the British Museum Reading Room for his Historia de la marina mercante de Chile (University of Chile Press, 1961). From 1962 to 1966, he was senior research fellow at the Royal Institute of International Affairs, Chatham House, where he organised the seminar that eventually became the Boston, Melbourne, Oxford, Vancouver Conversazioni on Culture and Society.

in 1963, he visited Cuba with a small group of Chilean economists drawn from the Lautaro Group, including Jaime Barrios, Alban Lataste, and the brothers Sergio and German Aranda, invited by Carlos Rafael Rodriguez and Ernesto "Che" Guevara to stay and help to manage various aspects of the Cuban economy. All except Veliz accepted and served for some years in senior positions in the revolutionary government. Professor Veliz declined partly because he found the climate intolerable. An unintended result of this visit was a collaboration with Feliks Topolski to produce his chronicle on Cuba.

in 1965, Veliz convened a major Chatham House conference on Latin America and edited the resulting papers in two volumes, Obstacles to Change in Latin America (Oxford University Press, 1965) and The Politics of Conformity in Latin America (Oxford University Press, 1967) followed a year later by Latin America and the Caribbean: A Handbook (London, 1968)

Back in Chile, in 1966, he founded and directed the Instituto de Estudios Internacionales, Universidad de Chile and was appointed Professor International Politics at the Chilean War Academy. In 1969, the Australian Institute of International Affairs invited Professor Veliz to deliver the Dyason Memorial Lectures and in 1970 he was visiting professor of history at the University of California, Los Angeles. That same year, he organised the institute's Conference of the Pacific, the first major undertaking in recent history to open Latin America towards the oceanic ambit with principal participation form Japan, Australia, New Zealand, Singapore, China and Malaysia. In 1972, he accepted an invitation from La Trobe University, Melbourne, to take a chair in sociology, which he held until 1989 also serving as dean of the School of Social Sciences. At the Institute of International Studies of the University of Chile, he was succeeded by exceptionally able directors who weathered the troubled times associated with the Allende regime and its demise and brought the institute to its present status as a principal Latin American academic centre.

In 1975–76, he was a Guggenheim Fellow and a Tinker Fellow in 1979–80 when we was also visiting professor of history at Harvard University. The research conducted during the period and under these sponsorships resulted in the publication of The Centralist Tradition of Latin America (Princeton University Press, 1980). His article on "A World Made in England" published in Quadrant in March 1983, was awarded that year's George Watson Prize for a political essay, and in 1986 he was invited to deliver the annual Latham Memorial Lecture at the University of Sydney.

He is emeritus professor of history and emeritus university professor, Boston University, where he worked from 1989 to 2002. In 2003 he was appointed Grand Officer of the Gabriela Mistral Order by the Government of Chile. He is currently working on a book on the Englishness of modernity following his 2006 inaugural lecture for the newly created Anglosphere Institute, delivered at the invitation of the Hudson Institute of Washington, D.C.

== Academic posts held ==
- Professor of economic history, University of Chile, 1956–1960
- Senior research fellow, Royal Institute of International Affairs, 1961–1966
- Founder and director of the Institute of International Studies, University of Chile 1966–1972
- Professor of international politics, University of Chile, 1966–1972
- Professor of international politics, Chilean War Academy, 1968–1972
- Professor of sociology and dean of the School of Social Sciences, La Trobe University, Melbourne, Australia (1972–1989)
- Visiting professor of history, University of California, Los Angeles, 1969–1970.
- Visiting professor of history, Harvard University, 1979–1980.
- Professor of history and director of the university professors at Boston University (1990–2002)

== Other notable titles ==
- Fellow of the Royal Historical Society
- President of the Research Students Association, London School of Economics
- Editor of the 'Clare Market Review', London School of Economics
- London School of Economics representative to tour USSR in 1954
- Wrote for The New Statesman and Nation, Reynolds News, The Economist Intelligence Unit, and the Daily Mirror.

== Bibliography ==
Books:

- Historia de la marina mercante de Chile, Ediciones de la Universidad de Chile, 1961
- Editor, Obstacles to Change in Latin America, Oxford University Press, 1965
- Editor, The Politics of Conformity in Latin America, Oxford University Press, 1967
- Editor, Latin America and the Caribbean: A Handbook, London, 1968
- The Centralist Tradition of Latin America, Princeton University Press, 1980
- The New World of the Gothic Fox, University of California Press, 1994

Chapters in books:

- “Britain and the Underdeveloped World” in Peter Hall, editor, Labour's New Frontiers, London, 1964
- “Latin America: The Forces of Change”, in A.J.P. Taylor and J.M. Roberts, editors, History of the 20th Century; Latin America, Why Revolution?, London, 1970, cap.109
- “La política exterior y el surgimiento del nacionalismo en America Latina”, in Carlos Naudon, editor, America ’70. Servidumbre o independencia en la presente década? Ediciones Nueva Universidad, Universidad Católica de Chile, 1970
- “Latin America’s Opening to the Pacific”, in Joseph Grunwald, editor, Latin America and the World Economy: A Changing International Order, Beverly Hills, California, 1978
- “Globalisms, Nationalisms, Republicanisms, and the Devastating Sanity of the Australian People” in Matters of the Mind, Poems, Essays and Interviews in Honour of Leonie Kramer, eds., Lee Jobling & Catherine Runcie, The University of Sydney, 2001

Booklets:

- The Worth of Nations, Claudio Véliz, editor, Boston, Melbourne, Oxford, Vancouver Conversazioni on Culture and Society, Boston University, 1993
- Monuments for an Age Without Heroes, Claudio Véliz, editor, Boston, Melbourne, Oxford, Vancouver Conversazioni on Culture and Society, Boston University, 1996
- Post-modernisms: Origins, Consequences, Reconsiderations”, Claudio Véliz, editor, Boston, Melbourne, Oxford, Vancouver Conversazioni on Culture and Society, Boston University, 2002

Lectures:

- “Continuities and Departures in Chilean History”, Canning House Lecture, Diamante XXX, The Hispanic and Luso Brazilian Council, London, 1981
- “The Gothic Mode of Australian Culture” The 1986 Latham Memorial Lecture, Quadrant, March 1987
- “Centralism, Industrialisation and Conformity in Latin America”; “Foreign Policy and the Rise of Nationalism in Latin America”, Dyason Memorial Lectures 1969, The Australian Outlook, The Australian Institute of International Affairs, December 1969
- “Nacionalismo, globalizaciones y la sociedad chilena”, Decimoséptimo Aniversario, Universidad Diego Portales, 1999

Articles:

- “Anti-Catholic Peron”, The Nation, 29 January 1955
- “Notas libres sobre la naturaleza del saber histórico”, Anales de la Universidad de Chile, Aňo CXIX, No.124, 1961
- “La mesa de tres patas”, Desarrollo Económico, Instituto de Desarrollo Económico y Social, Buenos Aires, vol. 3, No. 1, 1963
- “Latin America: A Challenge to Britain”, Aspect, June 1963
- “Letter from Cuba”, New Society, 29 August 1963
- “Cuban See-Saw”, Aspect, November 1963
- “Cuba”, Topolski's Chronicle, No. 17-20, vol.XI, 1963
- “El Instituto de Estudios Internacionales de la Universidad de Chile”, Estudios Internacionales, Instituto de Estudios Internacionales, Universidad de Chile, vol. 1, no. 1, Abril, 1967
- “The Mexican Upheaval: Back to Diaz”, New Society, 17 October 1968
- “Centralism and Nationalism in Latin America”, Foreign Affairs, New York, 1968
- “El Seminario de Arica”, Estudios Internacionales, Instituto de Estudios Internacionales, Universidad de Chile, Abril-Junio, 1968
- “Cambio y continuidad: El Pacto Andino en la historia contemporánea”, Estudios Internacionales, Instituto de Estudios Internacionales, Universidad de Chile, Santiago, Enero-marzo 1971.
- “Egaňa, Lambert, and the Chilean Mining Associations of 1825”, The Hispanic American Historical Review, November 1975
- “The Irisarri Loan”, Boletín de Estudios Latinoamericanos y del Caribe, Diciembre, 1977
- “La Tradición Centralista en América Latina”, Estudios Internacionales, Instituto de Estudios Internacionales, Universidad de Chile, vol. 13 No 50, Abril- Junio, 1980
- “The Wilder Shores of Politics”, International Journal, Canadian Institute of International Affairs, Winter 1981–1982
- “Bad History”, Quadrant, May 1982
- “A World Made in England”, Quadrant, March 1983
- “Professor Blainey’s Heresy. An Ocker Inquisition?” Quadrant, May 1985
- “The Latin-Americanisation of Australia? Down Argentina Way” Quadrant, April 1986
- “The Closing of the Australian Mind?” IPA Review, Melbourne, February–April 1988
- “Australian Universities: More is Better” IPA Review, Melbourne, May–July 1988
- “El Nuevo Mundo: gesta menor del momento castellano”, Estudios Públicos, Santiago, No 48, 1992
- “Persistencias culturales y preocupaciones innecesarias”, Revista Universitaria, Pontificia Universidad Católica de Chile, cuarta entrega, No.54, 1996
- “Simetrías y divergencias en la historia de Argentina y Chile”, Estudios Públicos, Santiago, No 63, 1996
- “Sur y Norte de la cultura del Nuevo Mundo”, Estudios Internacionales, Instituto de Estudios Internacionales, Universidad de Chile, vol. 29, No 115, Julio–Septiembre, 1996
- “Isaiah Berlin: Humanitates magister”, Estudios Públicos, Santiago, No. 80, 2000
- “History as an Alibi”, Quadrant, March 2003
- “Industrial Modernity and Its Anti-Americanisms”, The Hedgehog Review, University of Virginia, Spring 2003
- “Moustache Ring”, Quadrant, March 2005
- “Peron, Whitlam, Argentina and Australia”, Quadrant, June 2005
- “The Enduring Deception of Goya”, Quadrant, October 2006
- “The True Genesis of Amnesty International”, Quadrant, May 2007
- “William F. Buckley Jr., A Burke for our Times”, Quadrant, April 2008
- “George Bush and History’s Croakers”, Quadrant, April 2009
- “The Big State and the Servile Mind”, Quadrant, October 2010
- “Boeninger, Oakeshott y el estudio de los clásicos”, Estudios Internacionales, Instituto de Estudios Internacionales, Universidad de Chile, vol. 44, No 170, Septiembre-Diciembre, 2011
- “Pope Francis, Mauricio Macri, and Peron’s Last Hurrah”, Quadrant, January–February 2016
- “Crepúsculos imperiales y alboradas nacionales”, Estudios Internacionales, Instituto de Estudios Internacionales, Universidad de Chile, Santiago, Octubre, 2017

References:

- Alistair Horne, Small Earthquake in Chile, London, 1972
- “The New World of the Gothic Fox. Culture and Economy in English and Spanish America”, A Symposium, Peter Berger, Ricardo Arias Calderón, Irving Louis Horowitz, Edith Kurzweil, Robert Pakenham, Roger Scruton, and Claudio Véliz, Partisan Review, vol. LXII, No. 2, 1995
- Abraham Quezada Vergara, editor, Pablo Neruda-Claudio Véliz, correspondencia en el camino al premio Nobel, Dirección de Bibliotecas, Archivos y Museos, Santiago, 2001
- Claudio Véliz “The True Genesis of Amnesty International”, Quadrant, May 2007
- Jenny Zimmer, The Melbourne Conversazioni and the Boston, Melbourne, Oxford, Vancouver Conversazioni on Culture and Society, Melbourne, 2012
- Philip Ayres, “The Worlds of Claudio Véliz”, parts 1 and II, Quadrant, December 2014 and January–February 2015
