= Anthony Doob =

Canadian criminologist and professor

- Born: Anthony Newcomb Doob; 1943 (age 82–83)
- Spouse: Patricia Baranek (married 1980)
- Relatives: Leonard W. Doob (father)

Academic background
- Education: Harvard University (AB); Stanford University (PhD)
- Thesis: Some determinants of aggression (1967)

Academic work
- Discipline: Criminology
- Institutions: University of Toronto

Anthony Newcomb Doob (born 1943) is a Canadian criminologist and professor emeritus of criminology at the Centre for Criminology & Sociolegal Studies of the University of Toronto.

== Early life and education ==
Doob is the son of Leonard W. Doob, a longtime professor of psychology at Yale University who served as the director of overseas intelligence for the United States Office of War Information during World War II. Anthony Doob earned a Bachelor of Arts degree from Harvard University and a PhD in psychology from Stanford University.

== Career ==
Doob is one of the most prolific criminologists in Canada, and is consistently one of the three most cited Canadian scholars in the field. He was previously the director of the University of Toronto's Centre of Criminology, and held the position for longer than any other director. Since 2009, he has been a fellow of the Royal Society of Canada's Academy of Social Sciences. His research has included studying the effectiveness of certain crime-reduction policies, including carding.

In 2015 he was invested as a member of the Order of Canada.

== Personal life ==
Doob married Penelope Reed Doob, a scholar of medieval literature, in 1966. They divorced in 1973. He married Patricia Baranek in 1980. They have one son, Joshua.
