= Patricia Hermine Sloane =

American painter

Patricia Hermine Sloane (November 21, 1934 – November 21, 2001) was an American painter, author, and professor of fine arts at NYC Technical College of the City University of New York. She was best known for her abstract expressionism painting style, which can be interpreted as early street or urban art, with a close connection to the New York school movement. She was a member of the 10th Street Galleries (specifically the Camino Gallery) in New York City during the 1950s and 1960s. Sloane's books included topics on fine arts, art history, principles of color, and the works of T. S. Eliot. She was married to Kenneth Campbell, a sculptor and artist.

== Education ==
- 1954 – Hans Hoffman School of Fine Arts
- 1955 – BFA – Rhode Island School of Design
- 1958 – National Academy of Design
- 1968 – MA – City University of New York – CUNY – Hunter College
- 1972 – PhD – New York University – NYU

Her PhD dissertation was "The Description of Color: A Critique of Nineteenth and Twentieth Century Color Theory".

== Career ==
She was a frequent contributor to the Village Voice with critical writings as well as drawings. In 1956 she was an instructor at Ohio University. She also taught at the Jewish Community Center in Providence, RI, the Scarsdale Community Workshop, 1965, URI, Community College of New York, Trenton Jr. College, and she spent the latter part of her teaching career as a full professor at the City University of New York. In addition, she was a gallery lecturer at the Whitney Museum, and was awarded a Guggenheim Fellowship in 1974.

== Collections ==
Her paintings have been displayed at:

- MoMA – Museum of Modern Art
- University of Notre Dame
- Burgenland Landesregierung – Austria
- Oblanstini Municipay Museum – Czechoslovakia

== Recognition ==
Guggenheim Memorial Foundation – Received One Year Fellowship for "Studies in Color Theory" in 1974 for 1974–75 Academic Year (John Simon Guggenheim Memorial Foundation).

== Exhibitions ==
- The Riverdale YMHA
- Gallery 195, NYC, 1958
- Camino Gallery, 1961
- Providence Art Club, Brata Gallery, (solo) 1963
- Emmanuel Midtown YMHA, 1964
- Chelsea Exhibit, St. Peter’s Episcopal Church, 1964
- Silvermine Art Guild, 1967
- Grand Central Moderns, (solo) 1968
- Fordham University, URI, 1968
- University of Maryland Art Gallery, 1971
- Stamford Museum, 1972
- Landmark Gallery, 1973
- Bronx Museum of the Arts, 1975
- Phoenix Gallery Tenth Street Days exhibition, 1978
- Grace Gallery of New York Technical College (solo), 1983
- Olin Fine Arts Center (solo) 1984
