= Edgar Lipworth =

British-American physicist

Edgar Lipworth (1923 – 14 July 1977) was an American physicist, specializing "in research in molecular and atomic beams, nuclear physics, lasers and the symmetry of physical laws under time reversal."

Born and educated in England, Edgar Lipworth worked from 1944 to 1946 as a civilian research assistant on radar for the Air Ministry. After graduating with a BA from the University of Manchester in 1947, he became a graduate student in physics at Manhattan's Columbia University. There he obtained his PhD with advisor Willis Lamb with a dissertation on measurement of the Lamb shift in singly ionized helium. From 1953 to 1954 Lipworth held a fellowship with RCA. He also was a consultant at the Brookhaven National Laboratory and received research grants from the National Science Foundation.

From 1956 to 1961 he held a position at the Radiation Laboratory in Berkeley, working there on spins and magnetic properties of radioactive nuclei using the Rabi beam method. Lipworth joined the Brandeis physics department in the fall of 1961, a time when its graduate program was only five years old and entirely oriented towards theoretical physics. Together with Stephan Berko he succeeded in building up an impressive experimental research program in a very short time. A magnetic resonance apparatus with a high electric field allowed him to study the Stark shifts in the Zeeman and hyperfine structure of atoms.

Lipworth was elected a Fellow of the American Physical Society and served as the chair of its Division of Electron and Atomic Physics in 1966–1967. He spent the academic year 1974–1975 at the Hebrew University of Jerusalem as a Guggenheim Fellow.

He married Anna Rashbaum when he was a graduate student at Columbia University. He died at age 53 in Cape Town, when he was on a leave of absence for the academic year 1976–1977. He was survived by his widow, a son, and a daughter.
