= Leonard W. Doob =

Leonard Doob
- Born: Leonard William Doob; March 3, 1909; New York City, New York, U.S.
- Died: March 29, 2000 (age 91); Hamden, Connecticut, U.S.
- Children: 3, including Anthony Doob

Academic background
- Education: Dartmouth College (BA); Duke University (MA); Harvard University (PhD)

Academic work
- Discipline: Psychology; Sociology; Communication studies
- Institutions: Yale University

Leonard William Doob (March 3, 1909 – March 29, 2000) was an American academic who worked as the Sterling Professor Emeritus of Psychology at Yale University and was a pioneering figure in the fields of cognitive and social psychology, propaganda and communication studies, as well as conflict resolution. He served as director of overseas intelligence for the United States Office of War Information in World War II and also wrote several works intersecting cognition, psychology and philosophy.

== Early life and education ==
Born on March 3, 1909, in New York, Doob received a B.A. from Dartmouth College in 1929 and an M.A. from Duke University the following year. From 1930 to 1933, he studied psychology and sociology at the University of Frankfurt in Germany, taught at Dartmouth, and then received a Ph.D. from Harvard University in 1934. His dissertation, started in Germany, was a study of news propaganda.

== Career ==
He was an accomplished professor and scholar of Yale University from 1935 until resigning in 1999. In that time, he worked for the United States Office of War Information (OWI) during World War II, conducted several cross-cultural analyses and developed conflict resolution strategies in Africa and other conflict zones from the 1960s through the 80s, also publishing several compilations of African poetry during that time, and pioneered other works in psychology and philosophy up to the end of his long and prolific career. He was most active shortly before his death with his most recent book (Pursuing Perfection: People, Groups and Society) having been published in 1999.

A self-described liberal social psychologist, Doob served as executive editor of The Journal of Social Psychology for over a third of a century, resigning shortly before his death in 2000. He joined the Yale faculty in 1934. In 1935 he published his first major, and most well-known work, Propaganda: Its Psychology and Techniques. A book widely used by students in American colleges and universities before World War II. The book represented an effort to illuminate the process by which propaganda changed attitudes, with a view toward helping to induce some resistance to the phenomenon, concluding with a survey of such leading propagandists as Ivy Lee, Edward Bernays, and the Communist Party, and explored newspaper, radio, movies, and other channels of communication.

As Nazi Germany grew in strength, Doob sought to raise awareness among scholars, government officials, and the general public to increasing foreign propaganda. He conducted several communication studies, some of which analyzed rumors spreading within several communities in the United States and Canada. Through World War II he served as researcher, policy chief and director of the Bureau of Overseas Intelligence within the United States Office of War Information (OWI). Here he was instrumental in developing, applying and improving social scientific methodology to the work of analyzing propaganda.

After the war, Doob returned to academic life, publishing many books including Goebbels' Principles of Propaganda in 1950. He also wrote articles on aggression and frustration, attitudes, communication, and persuasion, before moving into cross-cultural analyses of developing countries and investigating previously unexplored topics in psychology. He was elected a Fellow of the American Academy of Sciences in 1966, also served as chair of Yale's Council on African Studies and as director of the Division of Social Studies before retiring in 1977. He continued to teach and publish before resigning shortly before his death in 2000.

=== Psychology and propaganda ===
Doob's approach believed understanding propaganda meant understanding communications and the behavioral sciences. Doob set out the mental context of propaganda by discussing motivation, attitudes, stereotypes, personality, and values. His psychological interpretation went to great lengths to describe the factors that influence and construct human behavior.

He explained much of public opinion to stem from enduring collective attitudes and sentiments, learnt through socialization. While noting that propaganda was not automatically successful, he observed that people were susceptible to suggestion, especially from prestigious sources, and thus the symbols of propaganda might arouse and recombine pre-existing attitudes. Propaganda sometimes resulted from the explicit intentions of a persuader but also could be unintentional, as when educators indirectly transmitted the social heritage of a culture. Drawing on Freud, Lasswell, and others, Doob examined the psychology of suggestion created by stimuli and stimulus-situations. Added to the exploration of attitudes, beliefs, suggestions and associations, Doob, appreciating the power in the personalization of the process, also explored how stimulating aspects of individual identity, emotion, pride, guilt and shame can influence decision making, behavior, and attitudes.

He defined propaganda in 1948 as "the attempt to affect the personalities and to control the behavior of individuals towards desired ends." He saw the objective of propaganda as action, not merely readiness to respond. Action, and just sentiment and attitudes, are the target. The learned attitude - the pre-action response - most affects behavior. Propaganda is concerned with learned attitudes insofar as they predispose and influence a desired response. The suggestive power of words depend on the primary and secondary meanings and upon the pre-existing attitudes which they arouse. His study of newspapers shed light on this definition, demonstrating how headlines have a pronounced influence on the way stories are perceived by readers. If individuals are controlled through the use of suggestion, then regardless of intention or source, the process may be called propaganda. In an essay he wrote in 1989, Doob came to believe a clear-cut definition of propaganda was neither possible nor desirable because of the complexity of issues related to behavior in society and differences in times and cultures.

The essential ingredients of successful propaganda, for Doob, contained three elements: repetition, cultural congruence, and flattery. Utilizing these three components, if the target is known and objectives clear, then the right acts combined with the right words, at the right time, can carry tremendous leverage.

Ultimately, Leonard W. Doob was no advocate for propaganda, like his contemporary, Edward Bernays was. Instead, he viewed propaganda, like others such as Robert K. Merton and Jacques Ellul, through a critical lens, as a form of social control. He recognized its increasing role in modern forms of power and his analysis was intended to increase this awareness in order to minimize its manipulation of society, politics, and culture. In the process of research, however, Doob brought to light the organic relationship that exists between modes of communication systems and the development of cultures and their psychology. Like many, if not all, of his fellow theorists on the subject, he recognized propaganda as an integral component of modernization.

=== Conflict resolution ===
Doob also studied the psychological dimensions of nationalism, modernity, and the role of media and communication systems on different developed and developing societies. He sought to explain why people modernize and what happens to them when they do, developing several methodological indicators to do so. He worked on developing scales of assaying psychological modernization amongst tribal societies in Africa, concluding that acculturation tends to lead to increased aggression and discontent and producing one of the most comprehensive lists of African communicative forms that exists to this day.

In the late 1960s and early 1970s several scholars of international relations developed conflict management training workshops, the purpose of which was to support a process towards peace in the context of intractable conflicts. Doob began experimenting with the application of human relations training methods to destructive conflicts in the Horn of Africa, Cyprus and Northern Ireland, helping to pioneer a third-party intermediary approach to conflict resolution. John Burton, Doob, and Herbert Kelman, among others, conducted "controlled communication" or problem solving workshops with high-level representatives of groups involved in protracted communal disputes in these societies.

== Personal life ==
Doob died on March 29, 2000, in Hamden, Connecticut. Doob and his wife, Eveline Bates Doob, had three sons. Anthony Doob is a professor of criminology at the University of Toronto. Christopher was a professor of sociology at Southern Connecticut State University from 1975 to 2012 and wrote several textbooks. Nick was a documentary director, cinematographer, producer, and editor known for his work on Assume the Position with Mr. Wuhl, Down from the Mountain, Simple as Water, Kings of Pastry, Al Franken: God Spoke, American Hollow, and others.

== Publications ==
- Propaganda: Their Psychology and Techniques (1935)
- Memorandum on Research in Competition and Co-operation. Social Science Research Council, with Mark A. May. (1937)
- Frustration and Aggression (1939)
- The Plans of Men (1940)
- The Meaning of the Term: Pressure Groups in a Democracy (1940)
- Propaganda and Public Opinion (1949)
- The Strategies of Psychological Warfare (1949)
- Goebbels' Principles of Propaganda (1950), reprinted in Propaganda, by Robert Jackell (2000)
- Social Psychology: An Analysis of Human Behavior (1952)
- The Use of Different Test items in Nonliterate Societies (1957)
- The Effect of Language on Verbal Expression and Recall (American Anthropologist February, Vol. 59 - 1: 88-100, 1957)
- On the Nature of Uncivilized and Civilized People (The Journal of Nervous and Mental Disease: Volume 126 - Issue 6 - ppg 513-522, 1958)
- Becoming More Civilized (New Haven: Yale University Press, 1960)
- Communications in Africa: A search for boundaries (1961)
- South Tyrol: An Introduction to the Psychological Syndrome of Nationalism (1962)
- Contemporary Psychology (1962)
- Nationalism and Patriotism: Its Psychological Foundations (1964)
- "Leaders, Followers, and Attitudes Toward Authority" (Pages 336-56 in Lloyd A. Fallers (editor), The King's Men: Leadership and Status in Uganda on the Eve of Independence. London: Oxford University Press, 1964)
- Ants Will Not Eat Your Fingers; A Selection of Traditional African Poem (1966)
- Scales for Assaying Psychological Modernization in Africa (Public Opinion Quarterly, Vol. 31, Nov. 3, 1967)
- A Crocodile Has Me by the Leg: African Poems (1967) with woodcut illustrations by Solomon Wangboje
- Just a Few of the Presuppositions and Perplexities Confronting Social Psychological Research in Developing Countries (The Journal of Social Issues, Vol. 24 No. 2, 1968)
- Resolving Conflict in Africa: Fermeda Workshop (1970)
- Creative Awakening: the Jewish presence in 20th century
- The Patterning of Time (1971)
- The Impact of a Workshop upon Grass-Roots Leaders in Belfast (Journal of Conflict Resolution, Volume 18, No. 2, 1974)
- Rationale, Research, and Role Relations in the Stirling Workshop, with Daniel I. Alevy, Barbara B. Bunker, William J. Foltz, Nancy French, Edward B. Klein, and James C. Miller (Journal of Conflict Resolution, Volume 18, No. 2, 1974)
- Pathways to People (1975)
- Panorama of Evil: Insights from the Behavioral Sciences (1978)
- Ezra Pound Speaking: Radio Speeches of World War II (Greenwood Press, 1978)
- The Peacekeeper's Handbook (Journal of Conflict Resolution, Vol. 22, No. 4, 737-739, 1978)
- The Pursuit of Peace (1981)
- Personality, Power, and Authority: A View from The Behavioral Sciences (1983)
- Slightly beyond Skepticism (1987)
- Inevitability: Determinism, Fatalism, and Destiny (Contributions in Psychology) (1988)
- Perceptions of Technological Risks and Benefits (1988)
- Contribution in Ethnic Studies (Number 25. New York: Greenwood Press, 1989)
- "Propaganda", International Encyclopedia of Communications. Ed. Erik Barnouw et al. New York: Oxford UP, Vol. 4. 374-78, 1989)
- The Inconclusive Struggles of Cross-Cultural Psychology
- Hesitation: Impulsivity and Reflection (1990)
- Asian and Pacific Islander Migration to the United States: A Model of New Global Patterns (1992), written with Elliot Robert Barkan
- Intervention: Guides and Perils (1993)
- Sustainers and Sustainability: Attitudes, Attributes, and Actions for Survival (1995)
- The Journal of Psychology Volume 133 Number 3 (1999)
- The Journal of Social Psychology Volume 139 Number 1 (1999)
- Pursuing Perfection: People, Groups and Society (1999)
