= McHale (farm machinery) =

Irish manufacturer of agricultural machinery

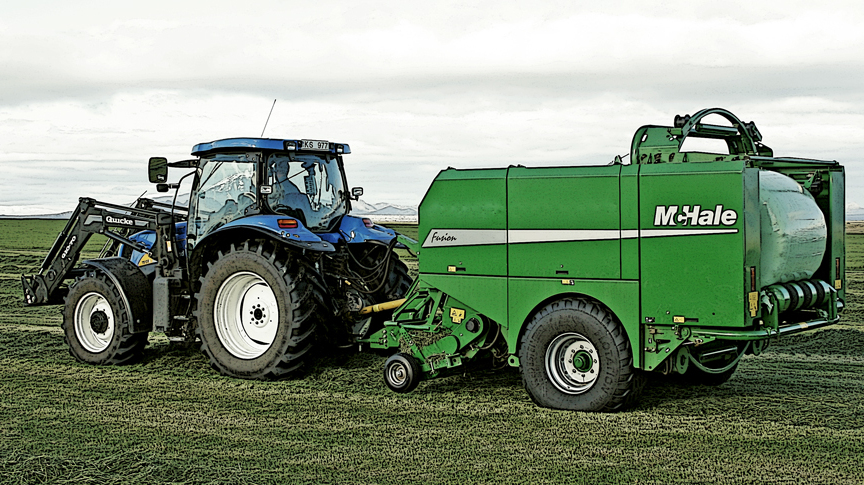
A McHale baler

McHale is an Irish firm manufacturing a range of farm machinery. It was founded in the mid-1980s by Padraic and Martin McHale. McHale is located in the west of Ireland in the town of Ballinrobe, which is approximately 40 km North of Galway City.

McHale integrated wrapper
