= Douglas M. Sloan =

Douglas M. Sloan is a curriculum theorist and author. He was a professor of history and education at Teachers College, Columbia University for three decades. He is a proponent of anthroposophy-based education.

== Works ==
His 1971 book The Scottish Enlightenment and the American College Ideal argued that American education owed its roots to influential Presbyterian Scots who never feared an educated populace unlike their counterparts in the Anglican church. It contributed to a larger ongoing intellectual discussion about Scottish and American relations (e.g., Ian Charles Cargill Graham's 1956 Colonists from Scotland: Emigration to North America, 1707–1783 and Andrew Hook’s 1975 Scotland and America: A Study of Cultural Relations, 1750–1835). In the mid-1980s, Sloan edited the collection of essays published as The Computer in Education: a Critical Perspective (Columbia University Press, 1985).

His 1993 book, Insight-Imagination: The Emancipation of Thought and the Modern World "argues that a fundamental transformation of our ideas about knowing, our selves, and our world is not only possible, but necessary. The key to this transformation lies in an understanding of 'insight-imagination'--the involvement of the thinking, feeling, willing, valuing person in knowing." Resource Center for Redesigning, ISBN 978-1885580009.

His 1994 book Faith and Knowledge: Mainline Protestantism and American Higher Education focuses on the rise and fall of various mainline American Protestant churches' engagements with higher education, noting that this now almost forgotten and often overlooked theological renaissance—begun by evangelicals of neo-orthodoxy in the 1930s—would fully blossom in March 1953 with the launch of an essentially new journal The Christian Scholar. Its morph into the journal Soundings fifteen years later would signal the renaissance's abrupt end.
