= Tommy McHale =

English footballer

Personal information
- Full name: Thomas Anthony McHale
- Date of birth: 3 September 1951 (age 75)
- Place of birth: Liverpool, England
- Position: Full back

Senior career*
Years	Team	Apps	(Gls)
- Prescot Cables
1971–1973	Bradford City	36	(0)
1973–1974	Wigan Athletic	2	(0)
- * Club domestic league appearances and goals

Thomas Anthony McHale (born 3 September 1951) is an English former professional footballer who played as a full back.

== Career ==
McHale made 38 appearances in the Football League for Bradford City between 1971 and 1973. He also played non-league football with Prescot Cables and Wigan Athletic. He played two Northern Premier League games for Wigan before leaving the club.
