= Jean Howard Hagstrum =

American educator (1913–1995)

Jean H. Hagstrum (25 March 1913 in Saint Paul, Minnesota – 5 November 1995 in Tucson, Arizona) was John C. Shaffer Professor Emeritus of English at Northwestern University in Evanston, Illinois.

== Career ==
Hagstrum taught at Northwestern from 1941 to 1981, was a distinguished lecturer of 18th century and Romantic literature. During his 40 years at Northwestern, he was a co-founder of the residential college system. He was chair of the English department. He managed the issue of the "Community of Scholars" report and directed one of the first Alumni Colleges on the subject of "Sex and Sensibility." Hagstrum published many works on 18th-century and Romantic literature. He focussed on relations between poetry and painting. His approach was not only historical but also psychological.

He was the author of several books including Esteem Enlivened by Desire: The Couple from Homer to Shakespeare, which earned him the Aldo Scaglione Prize for distinguished achievement by the Modern Language Association. He was also the guest of honor at the 1995 convention of the American Society for Eighteenth-Century Studies.

== Family ==
He was married and had two daughters, Katherine Hagstrum and Phyllis Meshulam.

== Honors ==
He was a Guggenheim fellowship winner for 1974. The English department has named the reception room at the library in the University Hall the "Hagstrum Room" in his honor.

== Publications ==
- Esteem Enlivened by Desire: The Couple from Homer to Shakespeare (1992)
- Eros and Vision: The Restoration to Romanticism (1989)
- The Romantic Body: Love and Sexuality in Keats, Wordsworth, and Blake (1985) Hodges Lectures
- Sex and Sensibility: Ideal and Erotic Love from Milton to Mozart (1980)
- Samuel Johnson's Literary Criticism (1967)
- William Blake: Poet and Painter (1964)
- The Sister Arts: The Tradition of Literary Pictorialism and English Poetry from Dryden to Gray (1958)
