= Tom McHale (novelist, born 1902) =

American writer

- Born: May 7, 1902; Sioux City, Iowa
- Died: November 12, 1994 (aged 92)
- Occupation: Novelist
- Writing career
- Genres: Satire, black comedy
- Notable work: Dooley's Delusion

Thomas Joseph McHale (May 7, 1902 – November 12, 1994) was an American novelist. He was the writer of Dooley's Delusion, a novel published in 1972, a story about the "Great West" (Sioux City) set in the 1880s and 1890s.

McHale's papers are kept in the special collections of the library of the University of Iowa.

== Works ==
- McHale, Tom. Dooley's Delusion. 1972. Droke House-Hallux, Anderson, S.C.
