= Tom McHale (novelist, born 1941) =

American novelist

- Born: May 29, 1941; Avoca, Pennsylvania
- Died: March 30, 1982 (age 40); Pembroke Pines, Florida
- Occupation: Novelist
- Writing career
- Genres: Satire, Black comedy
- Notable works: Principato, Farragan's Retreat

Tom McHale (May 29, 1941 – March 30, 1982) was an American novelist. His works include Principato, Farragan's Retreat (nominated for the National Book Award), Alinsky's Diamond, School Spirit, The Lady from Boston, and Dear Friends. He was born in Avoca, Pennsylvania, and received a Master of Fine Arts degree from the University of Iowa. He committed suicide in Florida in 1982.

== Early life ==
Thomas "Tom" McHale was born on May 29, 1941 in Avoca, Pennsylvania located nine miles (14 km) southwest of Scranton. He was the eldest of six children from an Irish-Catholic family. His family's Irish-American ethnicity and Roman Catholicism would become prominent elements in his novels.

He worked as a caseworker for the Department of Public Assistance in Philadelphia for a brief period.

He attended Jesuit Catholic schools including Scranton Preparatory (1955–1959) and was a graduate of Temple University in the early 1960s. He went on to earn a Master of Fine Arts from the University of Iowa Writers Workshop.

He had planned to be a doctor and attended medical school but changed his mind and dropped out.

== Career ==
After the success of his first novel, Principato in 1972, McHale secured the position of writer-in-residence at Monmouth University in West Long Branch, New Jersey, a position he held until the end of his life.

Shortly before his death he was offered a teaching position at the University of Pennsylvania that was to commence in fall semester, September, 1983.

McHale took an interest in writing early on, however, after attending a wedding in Israel in the late 1960s he decided to "give the writing monster inside me a chance and stayed there a year to see what I could do, to see if anything came up. I wrote a first novel. It was so bad that I tore it up into little pieces, took it out to the Negev Desert and threw it all over." Shortly after, he wrote a second novel and traveled to Paris, France, where he shared it with the widow of novelist Richard Wright. She liked what she saw and the book was later published as Principato, McHale's first important work. During a period of 12 years between 1970 and 1982, he produced six novels that received wide acclaim and positive reviews.

In 1976, McHale noted that he "writes in longhand, then has his work transcribed by a typist he describes as 'marvelous', she actually knows the English language and corrects my spelling and punctuation." He would spend an average of 18 months working on each novel but admitted that School Spirit only took him about seven months. During that period he was living in Boston, Massachusetts, and expressed that he would like to work on a movie script next because "I'm terribly interested in film. It's such a vast medium, so many people can see a movie. A novel, however, is limited in its appeal."

McHale described his work;

Parts of all of my novels are funny. But there's a tragi-comic sense to all of them. You can't deny the comedy, but neither can you deny the tragedy. It's there.

By 1972, Paramount pictures was very enthused about McHale's first novel, Farragan's Retreat. They even hired screenwriter Ring Lardner Jr. to turn the novel into a screenplay. This was during the time of Richard Nixon's election and Paramount eventually decided that the War in Vietnam was going to end soon. Because the book was about a young man who had gone to Canada to avoid the draft, the studio decided against using the story because they worried that by the time the film finally came out, the war would be over and the American public would have lost interest. As it turns out, Nixon prolonged the war, but by then Paramount had moved on. Lardner mentioned several years later, in 1982, that he regretted that Paramount dropped the project because it was the screenplay he "liked the very best that never got made."

=== Reception ===
Reviewers compared McHale's novels to those of Joseph Heller, Kurt Vonnegut Jr., John Updike and Philip Roth because of his black comic humor. They also saw considerable talent in his quickly growing body of work. A New York Times review in March, 1971 noted that "There are many young writers with healthy reserves of rags and chaos, some indeed with little else. What distinguishes McHale is not only the fertility of his invention but the humanity—remarkable in a writer of 28—that penetrates even his crudest characters.".

An article in Life Magazine in 1971 went on to say that "McHale writes as if born to the craft. He imagines and schemes like a beery poet. He sees, pokes, probes. He tells fabulous jokes---McHale's capacity to trigger emotions ranges from laughter to compassion to cold horror. Realism, pathos, mystery, Tom McHale is not another new writer. He is himself."

By 1976, a review from Associated Press gave much credit to the novel School Spirit for grappling with "questions that men have long pondered, questions such as the sanctity of life, guilt, punishment, redemption, but instead of creating what should have been a heavy philosophic text, he successfully produced a comic novel that makes the reader think, even as he laughs."

Not all reviews were favorable. In 1971 a scathing review of Farragan's Retreat noted that "this is an absurd book that started well. Now that this talented author has this novel out of his system, we can only hope that he'll live up to his potential."

== Personal life ==
McHale was married to Suzanne McHale and had homes in Kittery, Maine and Killington, Vermont. McHale enjoyed working with masonry in his spare time. He started in his mid-twenties by building fieldstone walls and later built fireplaces. In 1976, he proudly talked about the home in Maine, 60 miles from Boston, that he was looking forward to the construction of that summer; "It'll give me a chance to do some physical work. Outside, I'll do the masonry work on the base of the house and inside, I'll do the fireplace."

McHale committed suicide at age 40 at his sister's home in Pembroke Pines, Florida.

=== Bibliography ===
- Principato (1970) – The novel was "almost universally hailed as a remarkable debut effort." This is religious fiction and is a story about Angelo Principato, an Italian-American Catholic social worker from Philadelphia, Pennsylvania who marries an Irish-Catholic girl named Cynthia Corrigan who is the daughter of a wealthy mortician.
- Farragan's Retreat (1972) – The book received even more enthusiastic reviews than Principato and was named a finalist for the National Book Award later that year. Like his first novel, it was a story about Irish and Italian Catholics in Philadelphia.
- Alinsky's Diamond (1974) – Adeptly combined satire and comedy, by then a style very familiar to McHale. It is the story of Frances X. Murphy, an Irish-American hustler who marries into a "fine" French family.
- School Spirit (1976) – Explored the consequences of exposing a "long-buried secret" and was McHale's first suspense novel."
- The Lady from Boston (1978) – Dealt with the manipulation and betrayal of a young man by a beautiful woman and was far more cynical and darker than previous works.
- Dear Friends (1982) – His last written work was a deeply dark novel about a lawyer whose life unravels in a matter of days after witnessing two suicides and later discovering his firstborn child was fathered by another man.

=== Unfinished works ===
- Elspath's War Canoe (1977) – A story about a young man who comes to Boston from Kansas City. He's determined to knock the world for a loop but he gets knocked instead.

=== Awards ===
In 1974, McHale was awarded the Guggenheim Fellowship for Fiction for Alinsky's Diamond. He also received the Thomas More Association medal, an award given annually for the most distinguished contribution to Catholic Literature for his novel School Spirit in 1976.
