= Roth (surname) =

Origin
- Origin: Britain, Germany, Ashkenazi Jews
- Meaning: "red", or "wood", or "renown"

Other names
- Variant forms: Reitman, Roiter, Roitman, Rojter, Roter, Rothchilds, Rothe, Rotheman, Rother, Rothert, Rothman, Rothmann, Rothbaum, Rothnie, Rothbauer, Rothchild, Rothschild, Rothwell, Rott, Rottman, Rothin, Rothfuss/fuß

Roth (/rɒθ/) is an English, German, or Jewish origin surname. There are seven theories on its origin:

1. The spilling of blood from the warrior class of ancient Germanic soldiers;
2. Ethnic name for an Anglo-Saxon, derived from rot (meaning "red" before the 7th century), referencing red-haired people;
3. Topographical name, derived from rod (meaning "wood"), meaning a dweller in such a location;
4. Derivative from hroth (from the Proto-Germanic word for "fame"; related to hrod);
5. Local name for 18th-century Ashkenazi refugees to Germany;
6. Derivative from roe in the ancient Danish language to signify (of) a king;
7. Of the red colour of clay, as in pottery (German).

Note: Roth is not originally a Hebrew surname. Its origins are in northern Europe, and it is a common name in Scotland and other English-speaking countries as well as in German-speaking countries. For historic reasons, the Jewish people adopted various established names, many of which were common amongst non-Jewish people in their respective countries.

The first English-language historic record of the surname 'Roth' appeared in the United Kingdom in Colchester and Essex public records in 1346.

== People with the surname Roth ==
People with the surname Roth include:

=== A–F ===
- Agustina Roth (born 2001), BMX rider
- Aharon Roth (1894–1947), Hasidic rabbi
- Albrecht Wilhelm Roth (1757–1834), German physician and botanist
- Alice Roth (1905–1977), Swiss mathematician
- Alvin E. Roth (aka Al Roth) (born 1951), American economist
- Alvin Roth (1930s–2003), American basketball player
- Alvin Roth (bridge) (1914–2007), American bridge player
- Andrea Roth (born 1967), Canadian former actress
- Andreas Roth (runner), Norwegian middle-distance runner.
- Andreas Roth (painter), German painter.
- Andreas Roth (lawyer), German lawyer.
- Andrew Roth (1919–2010), British political biographer
- Ann Roth (born 1931), American costume designer
- Arnie Roth, American musician
- Arnold Roth (born 1929), American cartoonist
- Asher Roth (born 1985), American rapper
- Bruce Roth (born 1954), American chemist
- Carl Roth (basketball) (1909–1966), American basketball player and coach
- Carl Roth of Nedre Fösked (1712–1788), Swedish blacksmith, farrier and ironmaster
- Carl Roth II (1753–1832), Swedish ironmaster
- Carl Reinhold Roth (1797–1858), Swedish businessman and ironmaster
- Carol Roth (born 1973), American small business advocate, author and investor.
- Cecil Roth (1899–1970), British-Israeli historian
- Celso Roth (born 1957), Brazilian football (soccer) coach
- Charles Roth, American politician
- Claudia Roth (born 1955), German politician
- Connie Roth (born 1974), Canadian-American polymer scientist
- Dagmar Roth-Behrendt (born 1953), German lawyer and politician
- Daniel Roth (organist) (born 1942), French organist
- Daniel Roth (writer), financial journalist and senior writer at Wired magazine
- David Roth (disambiguation), multiple people
- David Lee Roth (born 1954), American, original and final lead singer of Van Halen
- Dick Roth (1947–2025), American 1964 Olympic gold medalist swimmer
- Dieter Roth (1930–1998), German-born Swiss printmaker and mixed-media artist
- Ed Roth (1932–2001), American artist and cartoonist
- Eli Roth (born 1972), American film director, producer, writer and actor
- Emery Roth (1871–1948), Hungarian-American architect
- Eric Roth (born 1945), American screenwriter
- Erica Roth, American politician
- Erich Roth (SS officer) (born 1910 in Auschwitz – executed 1947 in Yugoslavia for war crimes), Nazi SS and Gestapo officer
- Ernie Roth (1929–1983), American wrestling manager of heels
- Ernst Roth (1896–1971), Austrian-British music publisher
- Ernst Heinrich Roth (1877–1948), German violin maker
- Esther Roth-Shahamorov (born 1952), Israeli track and field athlete
- Eugen Roth (1895–1976), German lyricist and poet
- Ferdinando Roth (1815–1898) Famous Milan based musical instrument maker and inventor of the Rothphone
- Frances Levenstein Roth (1896–1971) was an American lawyer and founding director of the Culinary Institute of America.
- Francois-Xavier Roth (born 1971), French conductor
- Frederick Roth (1872–1944), American sculptor and animalier
- Friederike Roth (born 1948), German writer
- Friedrich Ritter von Röth (1893–1918), German flying ace

=== G–L ===
- Gabrielle Roth, American musician, "urban shaman"
- Gerhard Roth, (several people)
- Heinrich Roth (1620–1668), German missionary
- Henry Roth (1906–1995), American novelist and short story writer
- Henry Ling Roth (1855–1925), English-born anthropologist, active in Australia
- Holly Roth (born 1916, disappeared 1964), American crime writer who disappeared at sea
- J. D. Roth (born 1968), American TV personality, actor, children's game show host, TV voice-over performer, TV reality show producer
- Jane Richards Roth (born 1935), American federal judge
- Joanna Roth (born 1965), Danish-born actress
- Joe Roth (born 1948), American entertainment executive, producer and film director
- Joe Roth (American football) (c. 1955–1977), American college football player
- Joel Roth (born 1940), American rabbi
- Johannes Roth (1815–1858), German zoologist
- John Roth (disambiguation), multiple people
- Joseph Roth (1894–1939), Austrian novelist
- Jürgen Roth (1945–2017), German publicist and investigative journalist
- Justus Ludwig Adolf Roth (1818–1892), German geologist and mineralogist
- Kip Roth, American para-alpine skier
- Klaus Roth (1925–2015), British mathematician
- Laura M. Roth, American physicist
- Leah Lenke Roth (1918–2012), Israeli swimwear fashion designer
- Leonard Roth (1904–1968), British mathematician
- Lurline Matson Roth (1890–1985), American heiress, equestrian, philanthropist
- Ludwig Roth (1909–1967), German rocket scientist

=== M–W ===
- Mandy M. Roth, American novelist
- Mark Roth (1951–2021), American pro bowler
- Martin Roth (disambiguation), multiple people
- Marty Roth (born 1958), Canadian race car driver
- Matt Roth (American football) (born 1982), American football player
- Matt Roth (actor) (born 1964), American actor
- Michael Roth (disambiguation), multiple people
- Mickey Roth (1927–2025), Canadian ice hockey player
- Mike Roth, American writer and producer
- Miriam Roth (1910–2005), Israeli writer and scholar of children's books, kindergarten teacher, and educator
- Moran Roth (born 1982), Israeli basketball player
- Nina Roth (born 1988), American Olympic curler
- Otto Roth (1884–1956), Commissioner-in-Chief of the Banat Republic
- Paul A. Roth, American philosopher
- Paul Edwin Roth (1918–1985), German stage, television and film actor
- Petra Roth (born 1944), German politician, mayor of Frankfurt
- Phil Roth (1930–2002), American television and film actor
- Philip Roth (1933–2018), American novelist
- Philipp Roth (1853–1898), German cellist
- Phillip J. Roth (born 1959), American producer, director and screenwriter
- Rolf Roth (born 1938), Swiss chess master
- Randy Roth (born 1954), American murderer
- Richard Roth (disambiguation), multiple people
- Roger Roth (born 1978), American politician
- Sanford H. Roth (1906–1962), American photographer
- Simon Roth, Swiss curler
- Stefan Roth (born 1987), German politician
- Steffen Roth (born 1976), German academic
- Stephen John Roth (1908–1974), United States federal judge
- Stephan Ludwig Roth (1796–1849), Transylvanian Saxon intellectual, pedagogue and Lutheran pastor
- Steven Roth, real estate investor and founder of Vornado Realty Trust
- Susanna Roth (1950–1997), Swiss bohemist and literary translator
- Thomas Roth (born 1951), German news television presenter
- Tim Roth (born 1961), English film actor and director
- Trudi Roth (1930–2016), Swiss actress.
- Ulrich Roth (born 1954), German electric guitarist
- Veronica Roth (born 1988), American novelist and short story writer
- Vladimír Roth (born 1990), Czech ice hockey player
- Volker Roth (1942–2025), German football referee
- Walter Roth (1861–1933), English anthropologist in Australia
- Walter Roth (Minnesota politician) (1893–1973), American farmer and politician
- Werner Roth, multiple people
- William M. Roth (1916–2014), American politician
- William V. Roth, Jr. (1921–2003), American lawyer and politician
- Wolf Roth (born 1944), German actor
- Wolfgang Roth (politician) (1941–2021), German politician
- Yechezkel Roth, rabbi

== See also ==
- Rothe
- Liljeroth
- Rothchild
