= Carl Roth =

Carl Roth may refer to:

- Carl Roth (basketball) (1909–1966), American basketball player and coach
- Carl Roth of Nedre Fösked (1712–1788), Swedish blacksmith, farrier and ironmaster
- Carl Roth II (1753–1832), Swedish ironmaster
- Carl Reinhold Roth (1797–1858), Swedish businessman and ironmaster
