= Andreas Roth =

Andreas Roth may refer to:

- Andreas Roth (runner), Norwegian middle-distance runner
- Andreas Roth (painter), German painter
- Andreas Roth (lawyer), German lawyer

== See also ==
- Roth (surname)
