= Simakov =

Russian surname

Simakov (Russian: Симаков) is a Russian

masculine surname, its feminine counterpart is Simakova. It may refer to

- Alexei Simakov (born 1979), Russian ice hockey forward
- Anastasia Simakova (born 2004), Russian rhythmic gymnast
- Angelina Simakova (born 2002), Russian artistic gymnast
- Evgenya Simakov, Russian American physicist
- Valeria Simakova (born 1990), Russian figure skater
