= Daniel Roth =

Daniel Roth may refer to:

- Daniel Roth (organist) (born 1942), French organist, composer, and pedagogue
- Dan Roth, Israeli computer scientist
- Daniel Roth (watchmakers), a watch company
- Daniel Roth (writer), editor in chief, LinkedIn
