= John Roth =

John Roth may refer to:

- John Roth (clergyman) (1726–1791), Moravian clergyman
- John Roth (businessman) (born 1942), Canadian CEO of Nortel
- John K. Roth (born 1940), American-based author, editor, and professor of philosophy of religion at Claremont McKenna College
- John D. Roth (born 1960), editor of the Mennonite Quarterly Review
- John Roth (musician) (born 1967), guitarist with American band Winger
- John Roth (geneticist) (born 1939), American geneticist at University of California, Davis
- John Roth (politician) (fl. 2020s), American politician from Michigan
- John P. Roth (born 1952–53), American government official

== See also ==
- Roth (surname)
