= Paul Roth =

Paul Roth may refer to:

- Paul A. Roth, American philosopher
- Paul Edwin Roth (1918–1985), German stage, television and film actor
