= David Roth =

David Roth may refer to:

- David Roth (magician) (1952–2021), American magician
- David Lee Roth (born 1954), American rock musician
- David Martin Roth American convicted murderer
- David Roth (opera director) (1959–2015), American opera director and manager
- David Roth (soccer) (born 1985), American soccer midfielder
- David Wells Roth (born 1957), American figurative painter
- David Roth (writer), American sportswriter
- David Roth (politician) (born 1985), Swiss politician
