= Laura M. Roth =

American physicist

- Awards: Emerita Professor
- Scientific career
- Workplaces: University at Albany Massachusetts Institute of Technology

Laura M. Roth is an American solid state physicist, and an American Physical Society Fellow.

== Career ==
Around 1960, Roth was working at the MIT Lincoln Laboratory. Along with Mildred Dresselhaus, she was one of only two women among approximately 1000 men. Around this time she was being mentored by Benjamin Lax. She also has co-authored papers with Kenneth Button.

Roth became an American Physical Society Fellow in 1967, while at Tufts University.

She is currently Emerita Professor at Department of Physics, University at Albany.

== Selected publications ==
- Roth, Laura M.; Lax, Benjamin; Zwerdling, Solomon (1959). "Theory of Optical Magneto-Absorption Effects in Semiconductors". Physical Review. 114 (1). American Physical Society: 90–104. Bibcode:1959PhRv..114...90R. doi:10.1103/PhysRev.114.90.
- Roth, Laura (1964). "Theory of the Faraday Effect in Solids". Physical Review. 133 (2A): A542–A553. Bibcode:1964PhRv..133..542R. doi:10.1103/PhysRev.133.A542.

== Books ==
- Roth, Laura; Inomata, Akira, eds. (1986). Fundamental Questions in Quantum Mechanics: Proceedings of the Conference on Fundamental Questions in Quantum Mechanics held at the State University of New York at Albany, April 12–14, 1984. Routledge. ISBN 978-2881240584.
