= Liljeroth =

Liljeroth is a Swedish language surname.

== List of people with the surname ==
- Aurora Liljenroth (1772–1836), Swedish academic and scholar
- Leif Liljeroth (1924–2018), Swedish film actor
- Lena Adelsohn Liljeroth (born 1955), Swedish politician
- Tone Liljeroth (born 1975), Norwegian politician

== See also ==
- Roth (surname)
