= Kenneth Button (physicist) =

American physicist (1922-2010)

Kenneth John Button (11 October 1922, Rochester, New York – 30 August 2010, Indialantic, Florida) was a solid-state and plasma physicist. He was the editor-in-chief of the International Journal of Infrared and Millimeter Waves from its inception in 1980 until his resignation in 2004.

== Education and career ==
After four years in the U.S. Army Infantry during World War II, Button attended the University of Rochester, where he received his bachelor's degree and then his M.S. in physics in 1952. He joined in 1951 MIT's Lincoln Laboratory, where he did research, often in collaboration with Benjamin Lax, on semiconductors by studying their energy band structure using cyclotron resonance. Research on germanium and silicon done at the Lincoln Laboratory played an essential role in the development of semiconductor devices.

In 1962 he helped to found the MIT National Magnet Laboratory on the MIT campus in Cambridge. In 1965 he convinced H. A. Gebbie of the NPL in the UK to bring to the MIT Magnet Lab a copy of the newly discovered 0.337 mm wavelength cyanide laser. Using that laser, Button, Gebbie and Lax collaborated to study cyclotron resonance in semiconductors at magnetic fields up to 18 T and temperatures down to 40K. This THz laser spectrometer coupled with magnetic tuning of semiconductor bands opened up a major new field of research that led to many significant publications in the 1960s and 1970s. Ken held the position of Senior Scientist at MIT and headed the research group on quantum electronics until his retirement in 1988.

Button was in 1974 the program chairman of the first conference on "Submillimeter Waves and Their Applications". He was the founder, and general chairman for many years, of the annual conference called the "International Conference on Infrared and Millimeter Waves" (and now called the "International Conference on Infrared, Millimeter, and Terahertz Waves"). In his honor, the Kenneth J. Button Prize is awarded annually.

== Selected publications ==
- with Benjamin Lax and Laura M. Roth: Lax, Benjamin; Button, Kenneth J.; Roth, Laura M. (1954). "Ferrite phase shifters in rectangular wave guide". Journal of Applied Physics. 25 (11): 1413–1421. Bibcode:1954JAP....25.1413L. doi:10.1063/1.1721578.
- with Solomon Zwerdling, Benjamin Lax, and Laura M. Roth: Zwerdling, Solomon; Lax, Benjamin; Roth, Laura M.; Button, Kenneth J. (1959). "Exciton and magneto-absorption of the direct and indirect transitions in germanium". Physical Review. 114 (1): 80–89. Bibcode:1959PhRv..114...80Z. doi:10.1103/PhysRev.114.80.
- with S. Zwerdling, B. Lax, and L. M. Roth: Zwerdling, Solomon; Button, Kenneth J.; Lax, Benjamin; Roth, Laura M. (1960). "Internal impurity levels in semiconductors: Experiments in p-type silicon". Physical Review Letters. 4 (4): 173–176. Bibcode:1960PhRvL...4..173Z. doi:10.1103/PhysRevLett.4.173.
- with S. Zwerdling and B. Lax: Zwerdling, Solomon; Button, Kenneth J.; Lax, Benjamin (1960). "Zeeman effect of impurity levels in silicon". Physical Review. 118 (4): 975–986. Bibcode:1960PhRv..118..975Z. doi:10.1103/PhysRev.118.975.
- with Benjamin Lax: Microwave Ferrites and Ferrimagnetics. NY: McGraw-Hill. 1962. p. 768.
- with B. Lax and C. C. Bradley: Button, Kenneth J.; Lax, Benjamin; Bradley, C. C. (1968). "Quantum Effects in Cyclotron Resonance in p-type InSb". Physical Review Letters. 21 (6): 350–352. Bibcode:1968PhRvL..21..350B. doi:10.1103/PhysRevLett.21.350.
- with Clifton G. Fonstad and Wolfgang Dreybrodt: Button, Kenneth J.; Fonstad, Clifton G.; Dreybrodt, Wolfgang (1971). "Determination of the electron masses in stannic oxide by submillimeter cyclotron resonance". Physical Review B. 4 (12): 4539–4542. Bibcode:1971PhRvB...4.4539B. doi:10.1103/PhysRevB.4.4539.
- with Michael von Ortenberg, G. Landwehr, and D. Fischer: Ortenberg, M. v.; Button, Kenneth J.; Landwehr, G.; Fischer, D. (1972). "Cyclotron Resonance in Tellurium". Physical Review B. 6 (6): 2100–2109. Bibcode:1972PhRvB...6.2100O. doi:10.1103/PhysRevB.6.2100.
- with Zbigniew Drozdowicz, Paul Woskoboinikow, Kiyokazu Isobe, Daniel R. Cohn, Richard J. Temkin, and Jerry Waldman: Drozdowicz, Z.; Woskoboinikow, P.; Isobe, K.; Cohn, D.; Temkin, R.; Button, K.; Waldman, J. (1977). "High power optically pumped far infrared laser systems". IEEE Journal of Quantum Electronics. 13 (6): 413–417. Bibcode:1977IJQE...13..413D. doi:10.1109/JQE.1977.1069351. S2CID 9046045.
- with Stephen M. Wolfe: Button, Kenneth J.; Wolfe, Stephen M. (1977). "High sensitivity far infrared interferometry for plasma density measurements". In Hartwick, Thomas S.; Hodges, Dean T. (eds.). Proc. SPIE 1977, Conference Volume 0105, SPIE/SPSE Technical Symposium East. Far Infrared/Submillimeter Wave: Technology/Applications. Vol. 105. International Society for Optics and Photonics. pp. 72–79. doi:10.1117/12.955442. S2CID 95229690.
- with Mohammed Nurul Afsar: Afsar, M. N.; Button, Kenneth J. (1981). "Millimeter and submillimeter wave measurements of complex optical and dielectric parameters of materials". International Journal of Infrared and Millimeter Waves. 2 (5): 1029–1044. Bibcode:1981IJIMW...2.1029A. doi:10.1007/BF01006945. S2CID 125269511.
- Button, K.J. (1984). "Microwave ferrite devices: the first ten years". IEEE Transactions on Microwave Theory and Techniques. 32 (9): 1088–1096. Bibcode:1984ITMTT..32.1088B. doi:10.1109/TMTT.1984.1132820.
- with M. N. Afsar: Afsar, M.N.; Button, K.J. (1985). "Millimeter-wave dielectric measurement of materials". Proceedings of the IEEE. 73 (1): 131–153. doi:10.1109/PROC.1985.13114. S2CID 28473411.

=== As editor ===
- Reviews of Infrared and Millimeter Waves. Vol. 1. NY: Plenum Press. 1983. ISBN 9781461577669. (This is the 1st in a series of 16 books.)
