= Evgenya Simakov =

American physicist

Evgenya Ivanovna Simakov (née Smirnova) is a Russian-American physicist whose research has involved photonic crystals, metamaterials with engineered band gaps that can be used to suppress unwanted resonances in particle accelerators. She has also worked on the design of small portable particle accelerators, and the use of nanoscale arrays of diamonds to control the shape of electron beams. She is a researcher at the Los Alamos National Laboratory.

== Education and career ==
Simakov was a student at N. I. Lobachevsky State University of Nizhny Novgorod, where she earned a bachelor's degree in 1999 and a master's degree in 2002. Meanwhile, she began graduate study in physics at the Massachusetts Institute of Technology in 2002, and completed her Ph.D. in 2005, with research on photonic band gap materials in accelerators supervised by Richard J. Temkin.

She began visiting the Los Alamos National Laboratory as a student in 2003, became a postdoctoral researcher in the High-Power Electrodynamics Group in 2005, and was hired as a staff scientist in 2007, becoming part of the laboratory's Acceleration and Operations Technology Division.

== Recognition ==
Simakov won an award for Outstanding Doctoral Thesis Research in Beam Physics from the American Physical Society, "for the design, fabrication and successful testing of a 17 GHz electron accelerator utilizing a photonic crystal structure". She was a 2010 winner of the Presidential Early Career Award for Scientists and Engineers.

She was named as a Fellow of the American Physical Society (APS) in 2016, after a nomination by the APS Division of Physics of Beams, "for the development of photonic-band gap accelerating structures".
