= Journal of Infrared, Millimeter, and Terahertz Waves =

Journal

- Discipline: Microwave engineering, terahertz technology
- Language: English
- Edited by: M. Koch

Publication details
- Former names: International Journal of Infrared and Millimeter Waves
- History: 1980–present
- Publisher: Springer Science+Business Media
- Frequency: Monthly
- Impact factor: 1.762 (2020)

Standard abbreviations
- ISO 4: J. Infrared Millim. Terahertz Waves

Indexing
- ISSN: 1866-6892 (print); 1866-6906 (web)
- LCCN: 2009235073
- OCLC no.: 637789070

Links
- Journal homepage

The Journal of Infrared, Millimeter, and Terahertz Waves is a monthly peer-reviewed scientific journal published by Springer Science+Business Media. The editor is Martin Koch (Philipps University of Marburg). Its publishing formats are letters and regular full papers. The journal was established in 1980 (with editor-in-chief Kenneth J. Button) as International Journal of Infrared and Millimeter Waves. The journal's first 29 volumes (1980–2008) were published under the old title; beginning with volume 30 (January 2009) the journal has been published under its current title.

== Scope ==
This journal focuses on original research pertaining to the 30 Gigahertz to 30 Terahertz frequency band of the electromagnetic spectrum. Sources, detectors, and other devices that operate in this frequency range are given topical coverage. Other subjects covered by this journal are systems, spectroscopy, applications, communications, sensing, metrology, and electromagnetic wave and matter interactions.

== Abstracting and indexing ==
According to the Journal Citation Reports, the journal had a 2020 impact factor of 1.768. The journal is abstracted and indexed in:

- Science Citation Index
- Current Contents/Engineering, Computing and Technology
- Materials Science Citation Index
- Scopus
- Inspec
- Academic OneFile
- Astrophysics Data System
- Chemical Abstracts Service
- Earthquake Engineering Abstracts
- EI-Compendex
- Engineered Materials Abstracts
- INIS Atomindex
- ProQuest
