= Benjamin Danielsson Roth =

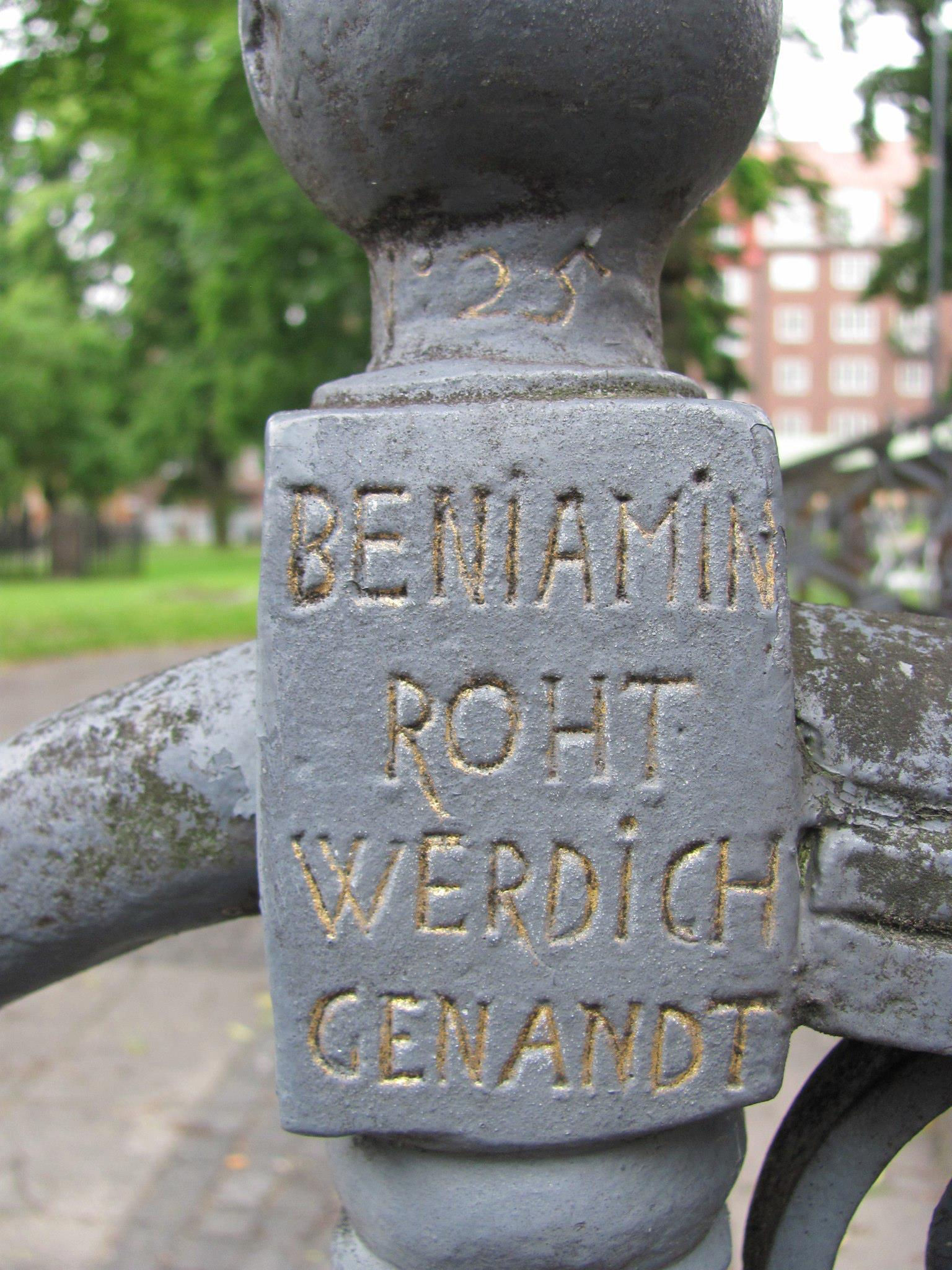
- Markings by Roth on Charles XII's Stair.
- Born: Second half of 17th century Electorate of Saxony
- Died: November 1737; Stockholm, Sweden
- Occupations: Blacksmith, Farrier
- Spouse: Catharina Berg
- Children: 7, including Carl Roth
- Parent(s): Daniel Roth, unknown mother

Benjamin Danielsson Roth (German: Roht) was a Saxon blacksmith and farrier who emigrated to Sweden near the beginning of the 18th century. He is best known for his work on Charles XII's Stair at Katarina Church in Stockholm, Sweden.

Roth settled in the part of Stockholm and married Catharina Berg. They had seven children.

Sometime between 1712 and 1715 Roth was commissioned to forge a railing for a staircase at Katarina Church in Södermalm. The stair was dedicated to Charles XII of Sweden and his royal monogram appears above the dedication date. He is also mentioned in the poem that is engraved on the pillars on either side of the stair. This double staircase leads from the cemetery up to the southern entrance of the church. It was dedicated in 1715. The railing was renovated by Benjamin's son, Carl Roth, in 1776.

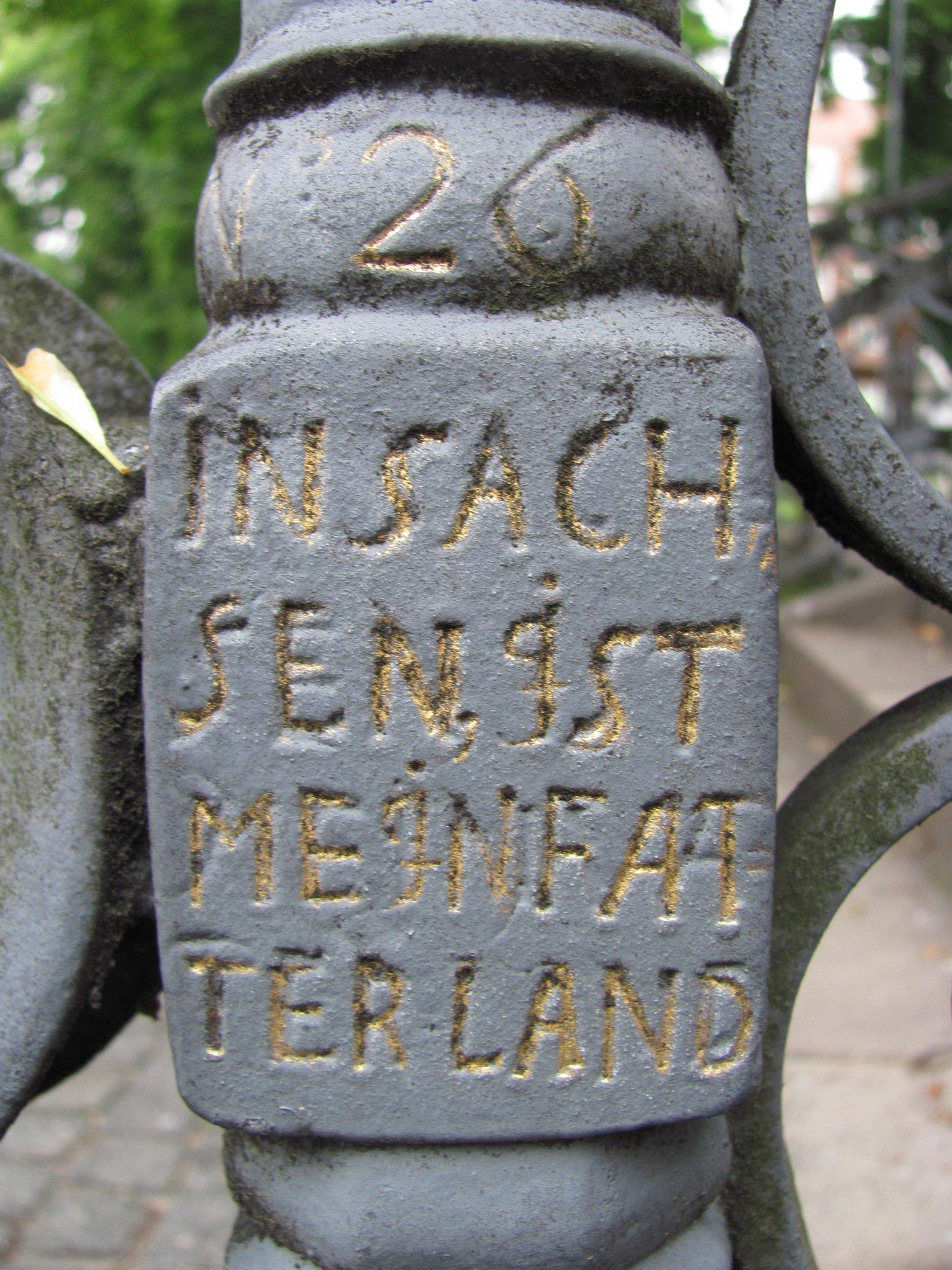

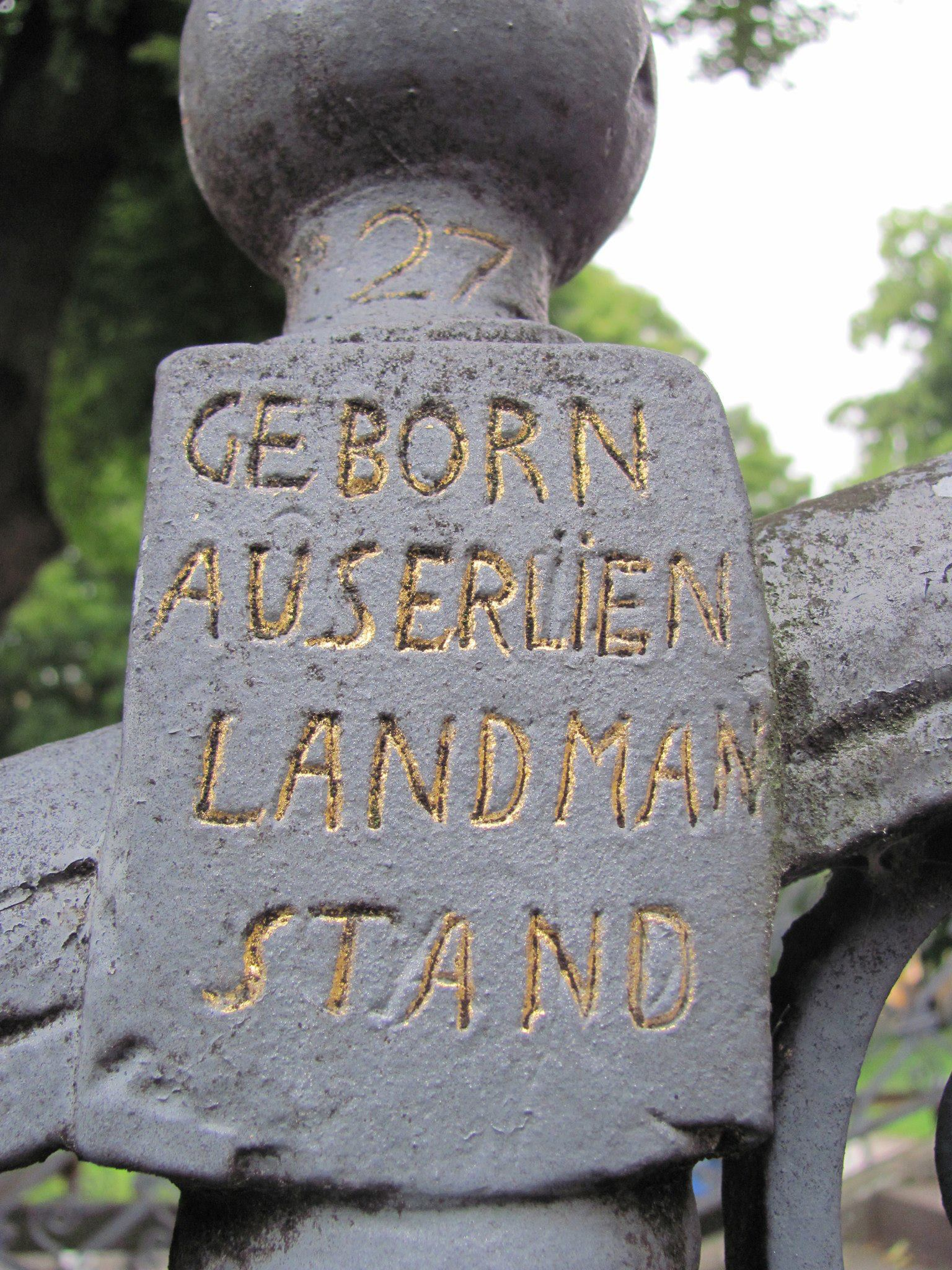

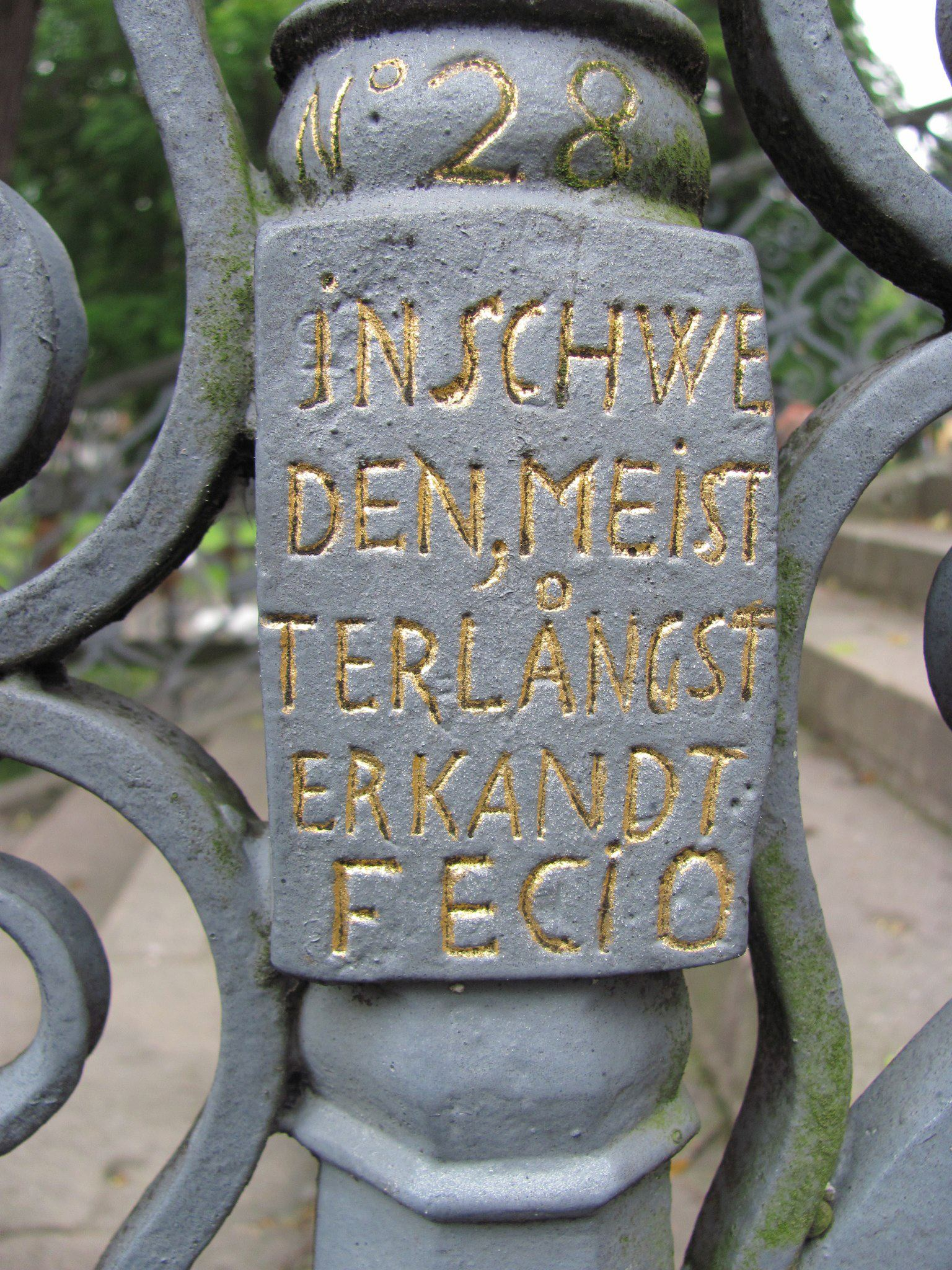
