= Tone Liljeroth =

Norwegian politician (born 1975)

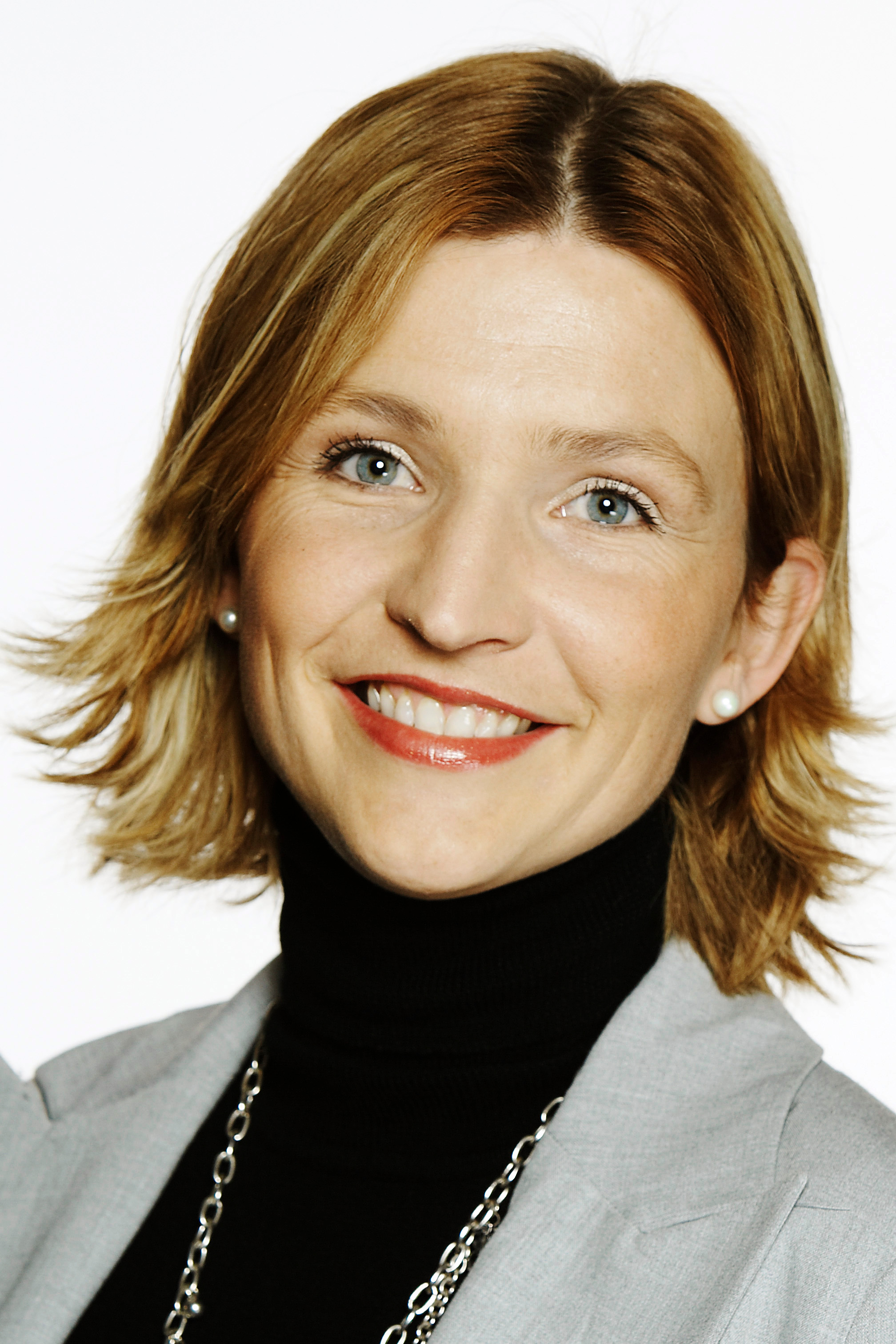
Tone Liljeroth.

Tone Irén Liljeroth (born 19 March 1975) is a Norwegian politician for the Progress Party.

She served as a deputy representative to the Parliament of Norway from Akershus during the term 2009–2013. She is also a member of Skedsmo municipal council.
