= Michael Roth =

Michael Roth may refer to:

- Michael Roth (baseball) (born 1990), British-American baseball player
- Michael Roth (cyberneticist) (1936–2019), German engineer
- Michael Roth (handball) (born 1962), German handball player
- Michael Roth (politician) (born 1970), German politician and Minister of State for Europe at the German Federal Foreign Office
- Michael S. Roth (born 1957), American academic administrator
- Mike Roth, A&R man who discovered and developed numerous famous Canadian bands
- Mike Roth (animator) (born 1975), Pennsylvania-born animator

== See also ==
- Wolff-Michael Roth (born 1953), scientist at the University of Victoria
