= David Wells Roth =

American painter

David Wells Roth is an American figurative painter. After his studies at Boston University, he moved to New York City to paint urban life and views of the city, then moved to Paris to paint at the invitation of a French family as barter for his paintings from 1982 through 1991 and continued to live in France through 1997.

In 2007, Roth was awarded a three-year judicial portrait commission to paint portraits of all thirty-three Judges of the United States District Court for the District of Puerto Rico, past and present. The project came about in 2006 after Chief Judge Hon. José A. Fusté of the Federal Court of Puerto Rico saw the portrait he painted of his colleague, Boston Federal Judge Hon. Richard G. Stearns of the first circuit (the district court of Puerto Rico is also in the first circuit). The 31 portraits were painted between 2007 and 2010. The final five portraits of that series were on display at the Whistler House Museum of Art in Lowell, Massachusetts in April 2010 in an exhibition called “Places and Faces” along with his cityscapes, still lifes and early portraits. All thirty-three portraits are permanently hanging in the central atrium of the Clemente Ruiz-Nazario United States District Court for the District of Puerto Rico in Hato Rey, in San Juan and can be viewed on their web site.
