= Martin Roth =

Martin Roth may refer to:

- Sir Martin Roth (psychiatrist) (1917–2006), British psychiatrist
- Martin Roth (television writer) (1924–2000), American scriptwriter, creator of Ark II
- Martin Roth (museum director) (1955–2017), German museum director
- Martin Roth (artist) (born 1977), Austrian artist living in New York City
