= Werner Roth =

Werner Roth may refer to:

- Werner Roth (illustrator) (1921–1973), American comic book artist
- Werner Roth (footballer, born 1925) (1925–2011), German football player and coach
- Werner Roth (soccer, born 1948) (born 1948), Yugoslavian-born American soccer player
