= John Roth (clergyman) =

American clergyman

Johann Ferdinand Roth, Johannes Roth or John Roth (1726–1791) was a Prussian clergyman who settled in the USA.

== Biography ==
Roth was born in Saarmund (a part of what is now Nuthetal), Brandenburg-Prussia, on 3 February 1726; he died in York, Pennsylvania on 22 July 1791.

He was educated in the Roman Catholic church, but in 1748 united with the Moravians. In 1756 he was dispatched to Pennsylvania, and three years later, entered the Moravian Indian mission , serving for fifteen years in Pennsylvania and Ohio. Returning to Pennsylvania in 1773, he was employed mostly in rural congregations till his death. He served as Pastor of the First Moravian Church of York on two occasions, and died shortly after the visit of President George Washington to York as John served as Pastor of this congregation.

His first son, John (August 4, 1771 – 1853), was the first white child, born in Bradford County Pennsylvania.

His second son, John Lewis (1773—1841), was the first white child that was born in Ohio.

Roth made a special study of the Unami dialect of the Lenape language, and composed in it an extensive religious work, "The History of our Lord and Saviour Jesus Christ," four fifths of which were lost by 1885. Only the last part survives: "From Passion Week to his Ascension to Heaven" (Ein Versuch der Geschichte unsers Herrn u. Heylandes Jesu Christi in das Delawarische übersetzt der Unami, von der Marter-Woche an bis zur Himmelfahrt unsers Herrn, im Yahr 1770 u. 1772 zu Tschechschequanüng an der Susquehanna). The manuscript is held by the American Philosophical Society in Philadelphia, Pennsylvania. This entire manuscript, which amounts to one-third of Lieberkuhn's harmony of the four gospels, has been transcribed and edited with an English word-for-word translation, and published in two volumes by Lenape Texts & Studies, Butler, NJ (2015).
