= Connie Roth =

Canadian-American physicist

Connie Barbara Roth (born 1974) is a Canadian-American soft matter physicist and polymer scientist whose research concerns the glass transition and aging in polymer films. She is a professor of physics at Emory University.

== Education and career ==
Roth became interested in physics as a teenager in Toronto through the MacGyver television show, and began her interest in polymer films through studying paper and toner in a summer internship at the Xerox Research Centre of Canada. She studied physics as an undergraduate at McMaster University in Ontario, graduating in 1997. She went to the University of Guelph, also in Ontario, for graduate study in physics, earning a master's degree in 1999 and completing her Ph.D. in 2004.

After postdoctoral research at Simon Fraser University in British Columbia and Northwestern University in Chicago, Roth joined the Emory University faculty in 2007. She was promoted to associate professor in 2013 and full professor in 2021.

== Recognition ==
Roth was named as a Fellow of the American Physical Society (APS) in 2019, after a nomination from the APS Division of Polymer Physics, "for exceptional contributions to the understanding of glass transition and aging phenomena in polymer films and blends". She was the 2019 recipient of the Fellows Award of the North American Thermal Analysis Society.
