= Rothchild =

Rothchild may refer to:

People with the surname include:

- Alice Rothchild (born 1948), American obstetrician
- John Rothchild (1945–2019), American writer
- Paul A. Rothchild (1935–1995), American record producer
- Sascha Rothchild (born 1976), American writer

== See also ==
- Rothschild
