= Richard J. Temkin =

Plasma physicist

Richard J. Temkin (born 8 January 1945) is a plasma physicist and researcher on plasma-heating gyrotrons and other electromagnetic devices involving high-powered microwaves or terahertz radiation.

== Education and career ==
Temkin received a bachelor's degree from Harvard University in 1966 and a Ph.D.from MIT in 1971, supervised by Benjamin Lax and Paul M. Raccah with thesis Experimental charge density of copper.

Dr. Temkin has served as a senior research scientist in the MIT Physics Department since 1985, and as the associate director of the MIT Plasma Science and Fusion Center (PSFC) since 1998. He is also the division head for the PSFC's Waves and Beams Division. Awards received include the IEEE Plasma Science and Applications Award (2013); Exceptional Service Award of the International Society of Infrared, Millimeter, and Terahertz Waves (2011); the Robert L. Woods Award of the U. S. Department of Defense for Vacuum Electronics, the Certificate of Recognition from the IEEE Electron Device Society, and the Kenneth J. Button Prize and Medal from the Institute of Physics. He is a Fellow of the American Physical Society, IEEE, and the Institute of Physics.

== Selected publications ==
- with Bruce Gordon Danly: Danly, B. G.; Temkin, R. J. (1986). "Generalized nonlinear harmonic gyrotron theory" (PDF). Physics of Fluids. 29 (2): 561–567. Bibcode:1986PhFl...29..561D. doi:10.1063/1.865446.
- with Lino R. Becerra, Gary J. Gerfen, David J. Singel, & Robert G. Griffin: Becerra, LR; Gerfen, GJ; Temkin, RJ; Singel, DJ; Griffin, RG (1993). "Dynamic nuclear polarization with a cyclotron resonance maser at 5 T". Physical Review Letters. 71 (21): 3561–3564. Bibcode:1993PhRvL..71.3561B. doi:10.1103/PhysRevLett.71.3561. PMID 10055008.
- with Kevin L. Felch, Bruce Danly, Hopward R. Jory, Kenneth E. Kreischer, Wes Lawson, & Baruch Levush: Felch, K.L.; Danly, B.G.; Jory, H.R.; Kreischer, K.E.; Lawson, W.; Levush, B.; Temkin, R.J. (1999). "Characteristics and applications of fast-wave gyrodevices". Proceedings of the IEEE. 87 (5): 752–781. doi:10.1109/5.757254.
- with Melanie Rosay, Jonathan C. Lansing, Kristin C. Haddad, William W. Bachovchin, Judith Herzfeld, R. G. Griffin: Rosay, M; Lansing, JC; Haddad, KC; Bachovchin, WW; Herzfeld, J; Temkin, RJ; Griffin, RG (2003). "High-frequency dynamic nuclear polarization in MAS spectra of membrane and soluble proteins". Journal of the American Chemical Society. 125 (45): 13626–13627. doi:10.1021/ja036898k. PMID 14599177.
- with Thorsten Maly, Galia T. Debelouchina, Vikram S. Bajaj, Kan-Nian Hu, Chan-Gyu Joo, Melody L. Mak–Jurkauskas, Jagadishwar R. Sirigiri, P. C. van der Wel, J. Herzfeld, & R. G. Griffin: Maly, T; Debelouchina, GT; Bajaj, VS; et al. (2008). "Dynamic nuclear polarization at high magnetic fields". The Journal of Chemical Physics. 128 (5): 052211. Bibcode:2008JChPh.128e2211M. doi:10.1063/1.2833582. PMC 2770872. PMID 18266416.
- with John H. Booske, Richard J. Dobbs, Colin D. Joye, Carol L. Kory, George R. Neil, Gun-Sik Park, & Jaehun Park: Booske, John H.; Dobbs, Richard J.; Joye, Colin D.; Kory, Carol L.; Neil, George R.; Park, Gun-Sik; Park, Jaehun; Temkin, Richard J. (2011). "Vacuum electronic high power terahertz sources". IEEE Transactions on Terahertz Science and Technology. 1 (1): 54–75. Bibcode:2011ITTST...1...54B. doi:10.1109/TTHZ.2011.2151610.

== See also ==
- ITER
