= David Roth (politician) =

Swiss politician (born 1985)

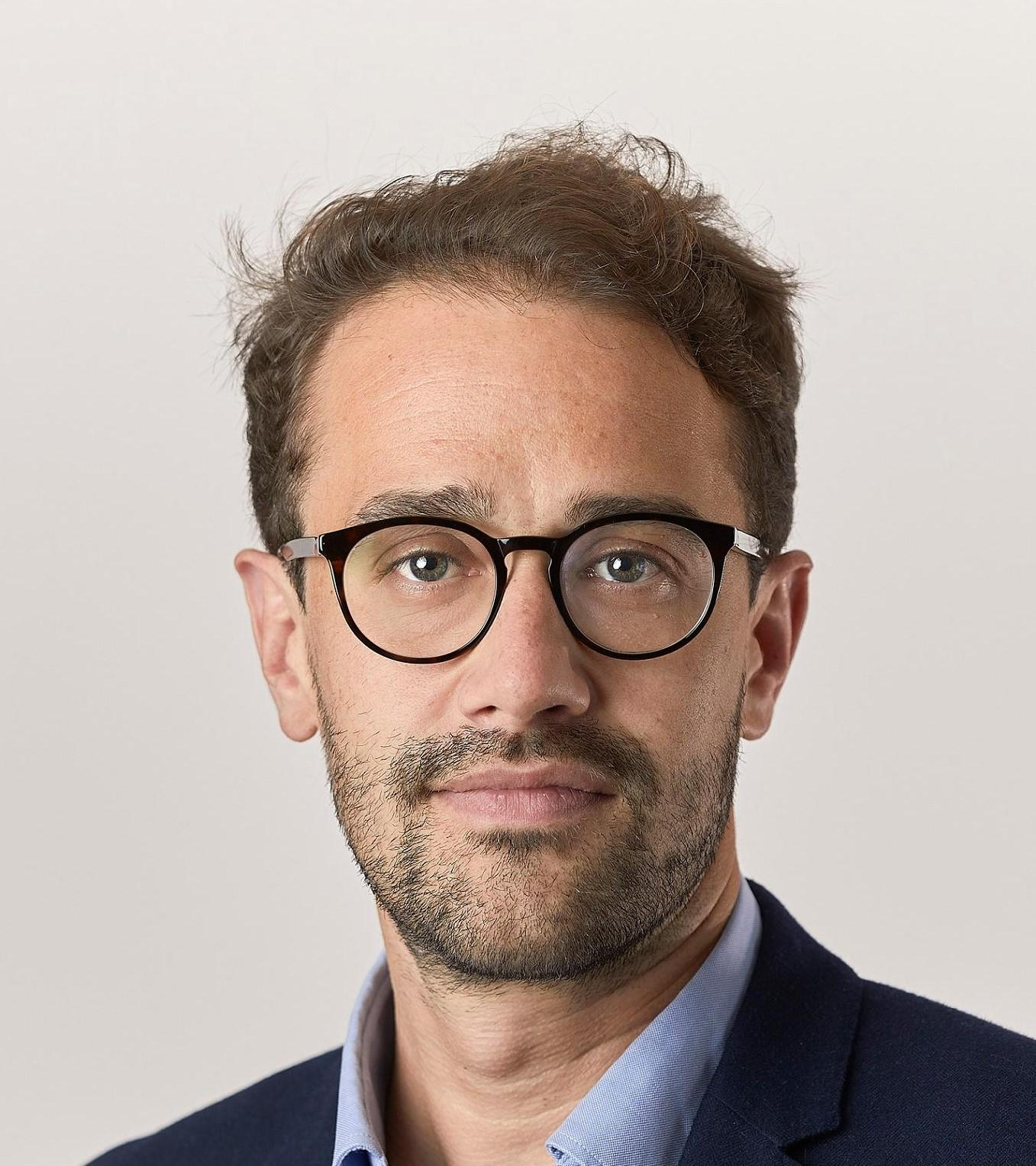
- Official portrait, 2023

Member of the National Council (Switzerland)
- Incumbent
- Assumed office 4 December 2023
- Constituency: Canton of Lucerne

Vice-Chair of Social Democratic Party of Switzerland
- Incumbent
- Assumed office 1 September 2021
- Succeeded by: Gianluca Pardini

Personal details
- Born: David Roth; 19 May 1985 (age 40) Lucerne, Switzerland
- Party: Social Democratic Party
- Occupation: Politician, unionist
- Website: Official website Parliament website

David Roth (German pronunciation: [ˈdaːvɪt ʁoːt]; born 19 May 1985) is a Swiss unionist and politician who currently serves on the National Council (Switzerland) for the Social Democratic Party since 2023. He concurrently serves as the vice president of the Social Democratic Party of Switzerland since 2021. Between 2011 and 2023, Roth served on the Cantonal Council of Lucerne.
