= Richard Roth =

Richard Roth may refer to:

- Richard Roth (CBS News journalist) (born 1949), American journalist for CBS News
- Richard Roth (journalist) (born 1955), American journalist for CNN
- Richard Roth (politician) (born 1950), American politician
- Dick Roth (Richard William Roth, born 1947), American swimmer

== See also ==
- Rick Roth, member of the Florida House of Representatives
