= Paul A. Roth =

American philosopher

- Born: 1948 (age 77–78)

Philosophical work
- Era: 21st-century philosophy
- Region: Western philosophy
- Institutions: University of California, Santa Cruz
- Main interests: philosophy of history
- Website: https://paulroth.sites.ucsc.edu/

Paul A. Roth (born 1948) is an American philosopher and distinguished professor of philosophy at the University of California, Santa Cruz. He is known for his works on philosophy of history.

== Books ==
- The Philosophical Structure of Historical Explanation, Northwestern University Press, 2020, ISBN 9780810140875.
- Meaning and Method in the Social Sciences: A Case for Methodological Pluralism, Cornell University Press, 1987
