= Benjamin Lax =

Hungarian-American solid-state and plasma physicist

- Born: 29 December 1915; Miskolc, Hungary
- Died: 21 April 2015 (aged 99); Newton, Massachusetts

Academic work
- Discipline: Physics

Benjamin Lax (29 December 1915, Miskolc, Hungary – 21 April 2015, Newton, Massachusetts) was a solid-state and plasma physicist.

== Biography ==
Benjamin Lax immigrated in 1926 with his family to the United States. After secondary education at Brooklyn's Boys High School, he received in 1941 his bachelor's degree in mechanical engineering from Cooper Union. After being drafted into the US Army in 1942, he was assigned to MIT's Radiation Laboratory to work on the development of radar. He received his Ph.D. in 1949 from MIT under Sanborn C. Brown, with thesis The effect of magnetic field on the breakdown of gases at high frequencies.

Lax joined in 1951 MIT's Lincoln Laboratory, where he did research on semiconductors by studying their energy band structure using cyclotron resonance. These pioneering studies of germanium and silicon played an essential role in the development of semiconductor devices. Lax was a co-inventor on an early patent for semiconductor lasers. He became in 1958 Head of the Solid-State Division and in 1964 Associate Director of the Laboratory. From 1960 to 1981 he was the director of the Francis Bitter National Magnet Laboratory. From 1964 until his retirement in 1986 he was a physics professor at MIT.

In the late 1950s, while still working at MIT Lincoln Laboratory, he led a group of scientists and engineers who proposed a high magnetic field laboratory on the MIT campus for research in solid state physics, plasma physics, magnetic resonance spectroscopy and magnet engineering. The proposal was accepted, the National Magnet Laboratory was established in 1960, and Ben served as its Director for its first 21 years. ... While Ben served as Director, the National Magnet Laboratory (NML) became an international leader in a remarkably wide range of research areas including the physics of solids in high magnetic fields; high magnetic field nuclear magnetic resonance (NMR); pioneering work on biomagnetism; a range of applications of magnet technology including magnetic levitation for trains; laser- plasma interactions in high magnetic fields and laser plasma diagnostics. He was also interested in the use of high magnetic fields to achieve better confinement of plasmas for fusion. The first high magnetic field tokamak confinement device, Alcator, was constructed and operated at the NML, successfully demonstrating the benefits of the high magnetic field approach. Eventually, the research on plasma physics and fusion energy required larger facilities, leading to the establishment of the MIT Plasma Fusion Center adjacent to the NML.

In 1960, he was awarded the Oliver E. Buckley Condensed Matter Prize for "his fundamental contributions in microwave and infrared spectroscopy of semiconductors.” At MIT he supervised the doctoral dissertations of 36 students. He was the co-author, with Kenneth J. Button, of the 1962 book Microwave Ferrites and Ferrimagnetics. He was elected in 1962 to the American Academy of Arts and Sciences and in 1969 to the National Academy of Sciences in 1969. He was also elected in 1957 a Fellow of the American Physical Society and in 1981 a Fellow of the American Association for the Advancement of Science. He was a Guggenheim Fellow for the academic year 1981–1982. In 2009 he was inducted into The Cooper Union Hall of Fame.

He was predeceased by his wife, Blossom Cohen Lax. Upon his death, he was survived by his two sons: Daniel R. Lax of Atlanta, Georgia, Robert M. Lax of Newton, Massachusetts, and his granddaughter: Rachael E. Lax of Pittsford, New York .
