= Carl Roth II =

Swedish ironmaster

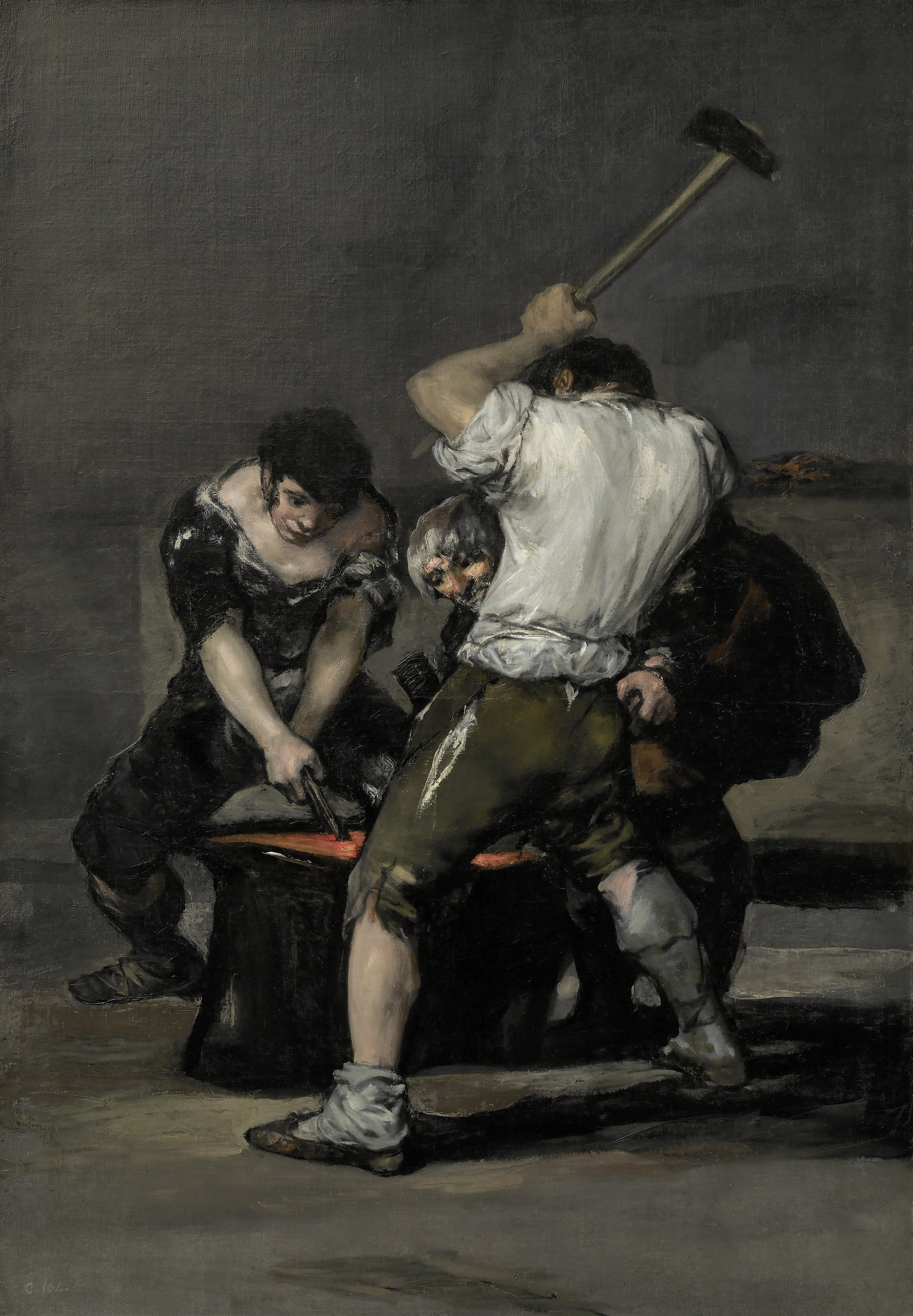
- Francisco Goya's Forge
- Born: 12 October 1753; Stockholm, Sweden
- Died: 30 November 1832; Karlstad Municipality, Värmland County, Sweden
- Occupation(s): Ironworks owner and manager
- Spouse: Elisabeth Antonsson
- Children: Carl Reinhold Roth (1797)
- Parent(s): Carl Roth, Agatha Romanians

Carl Roth II was a Swedish ironmaster who lived between the 18th and 19th centuries. He is best known for owning two ironworks in Karlstad Municipality, Värmland County, Sweden: Duvnäs (Duvenäs), and Nedre Fösked (Föske).

== Early life ==
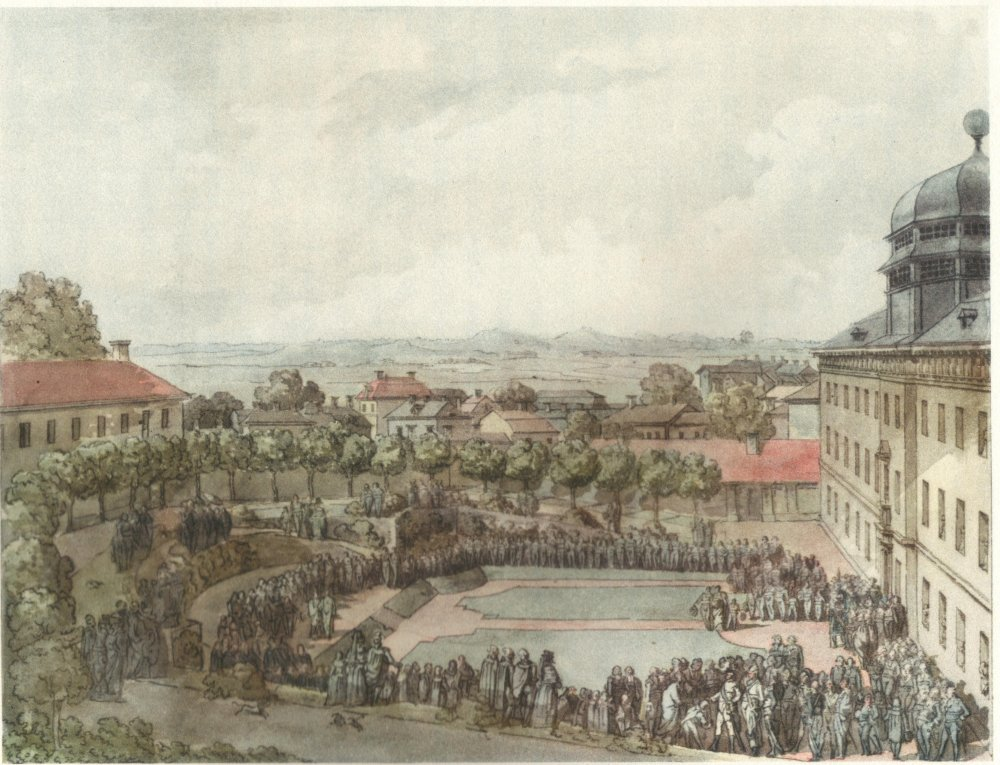
1792 drawing of Uppsala University by Louis Louis Jean Desprez

Carl was born on October 12, 1753, in Stockholm. On June 26, 1764, at the age of 10, he enrolled at Uppsala University under Stockholm's Nation. After graduating in 1771, he moved with his parents to their estate at Duvnäs where he focused primarily on agriculture and working at the family's mill. Carl was said to have a Godly and humble disposition and loved books above all else.

== Later life ==
Carl presumably took over operations at Duvnäs upon his father's death in 1788. On December 12, 1794, at the age of 42 he married Elisabeth Antonsson at Molkoms Mill. She was the only daughter of the Värmland renowned ironmaster, Judge Reinhold Antonsson. In 1795 he purchased Nedre Fösked from his brother, Benjamin, and captain Lars von Nackrej where all of his children were born. He worked as ironmaster of both Ironworks until 1817 when he sold them to the wholesaler Per Gustaf Geijer. He then rented a mill at Kjern (Tjärn) until 1830 when he purchased a home in Karlstad. Carl II died at the age of 80 on Friday the 30th of November, 1832 in Karlstad.
