= Carl Reinhold Roth =

Swedish businessman and ironmaster

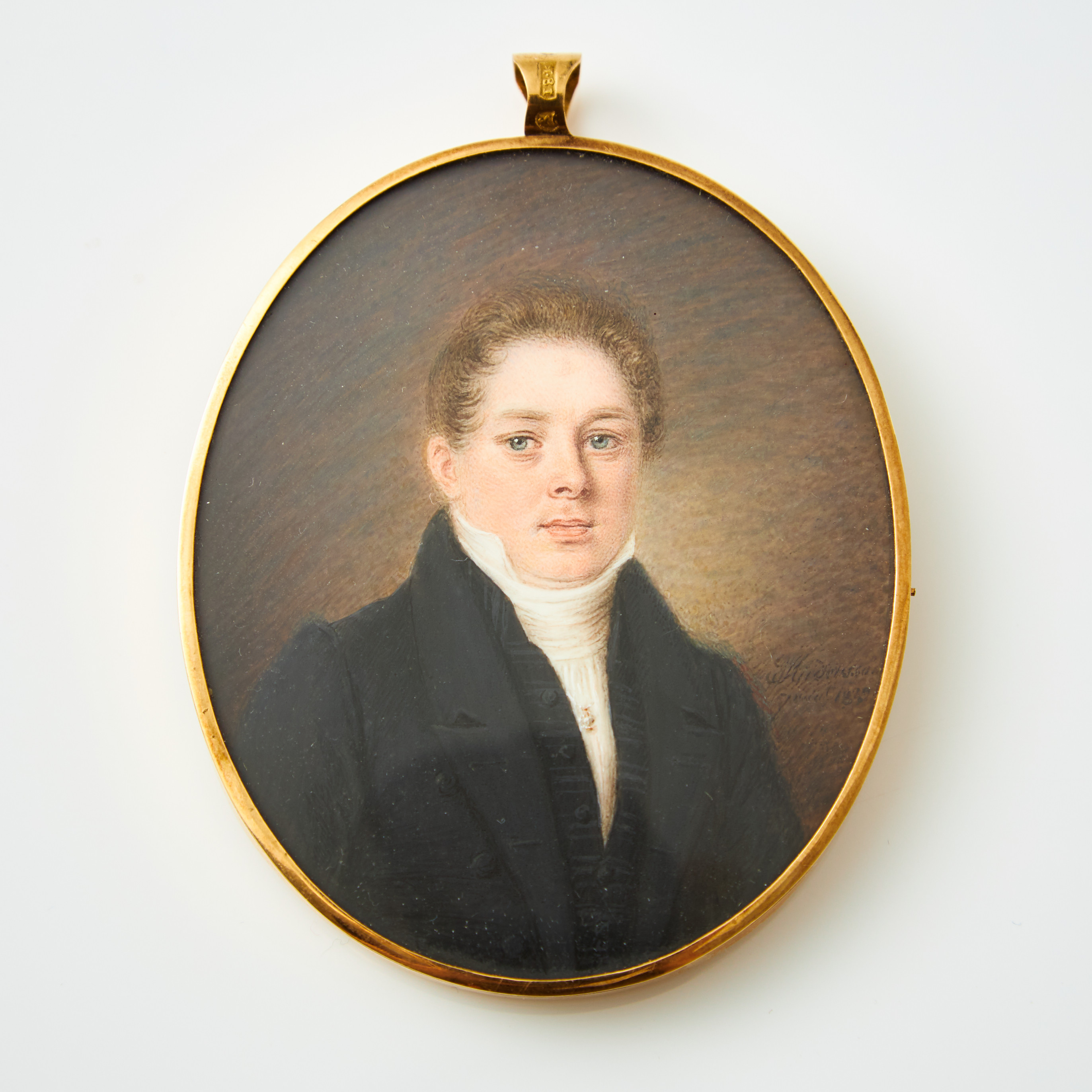
- Roth in 1829. Portrait by Anders Gustaf Andersson.
- Born: 18 November 1797; Nedre Fösked
- Died: 28 February 1858 (aged 60); Stockholm
- Occupations: Businessman and Ironworks Owner
- Spouse: Johanna Sophia Wilhelmina Atkins (1825-1826) Augusta Jacobina Settervall (1827)
- Children: Carl Edward Roth, Carl Emil Roth, Carl Ehrenfried Roth
- Parent(s): Carl Roth II, Elisabeth Antonsson

Carl Reinhold Roth (1797–1858) was a Swedish businessman and ironmaster who lived during the 19th century. He is best known as the first ironmaster named Roth at the ironworks in Ludvika, Sweden. Reinhold was in his time one of Stockholm's more prominent businessmen. He also owned Sunnansjö ironworks and estate, and Skogsegen (Judge Hörneåfor’s ironworks in Västerbotten), devoted himself to the nascent sawmill industry, and was ship-owner of the Augusta (named for his second wife).

== Early life ==
Reinhold was born November 18, 1797, in Lower Fösked. His career began in Stockholm, where he was employed by the merchant's firm Netterblad & Åbom. After some time he moved to Vij Ironworks in Ockelbo where his future father in law, John Alexis Atkins, was a famous Ironmaster. Carl Reinhold married the first time on Wednesday, September 14, 1825, to Johanna Sophia Wilhelmina Atkins. She probably died in childbirth because records show her daughter was born and died almost simultaneously. Mother and daughter are buried in the cemetery in Ockelbo. After John Atkins’ death in 1826, Reinhold took over as Ironmaster. In 1827 he married again to Augusta Jacobina Setterwall, a merchant's daughter from Stockholm, and in 1831 established himself as a merchant there.

== Later life ==
In 1836 he and Fredrik Langenberg each bought a third of Ludvika Ironworks from Wetter Anders Dahl. In 1841 Reinhold was able to purchase the remaining third and then owned two thirds of the ironworks. The final third of the mill was bought by his children from Langenberg's heirs after Carl Reinhold’s death in 1858.

Ludvika Ironworks had three forges and six hearths. They got the ore from their own mines and produced the pig iron in their own foundries. Though Reinhold became ironmaster of the ironworks, he continued to live in Stockholm and utilized the Ludvika estate only as a summer residence. Carl participated as a member of Borgerskapet (Burgher/merchant social class) in the 1847-48 Riksdag (parliament). He was one of 50 most senior and, in the 1856 Riksdag, was the eldest. He was also a member of St. Mary Magdalene parish church council.

== Images ==
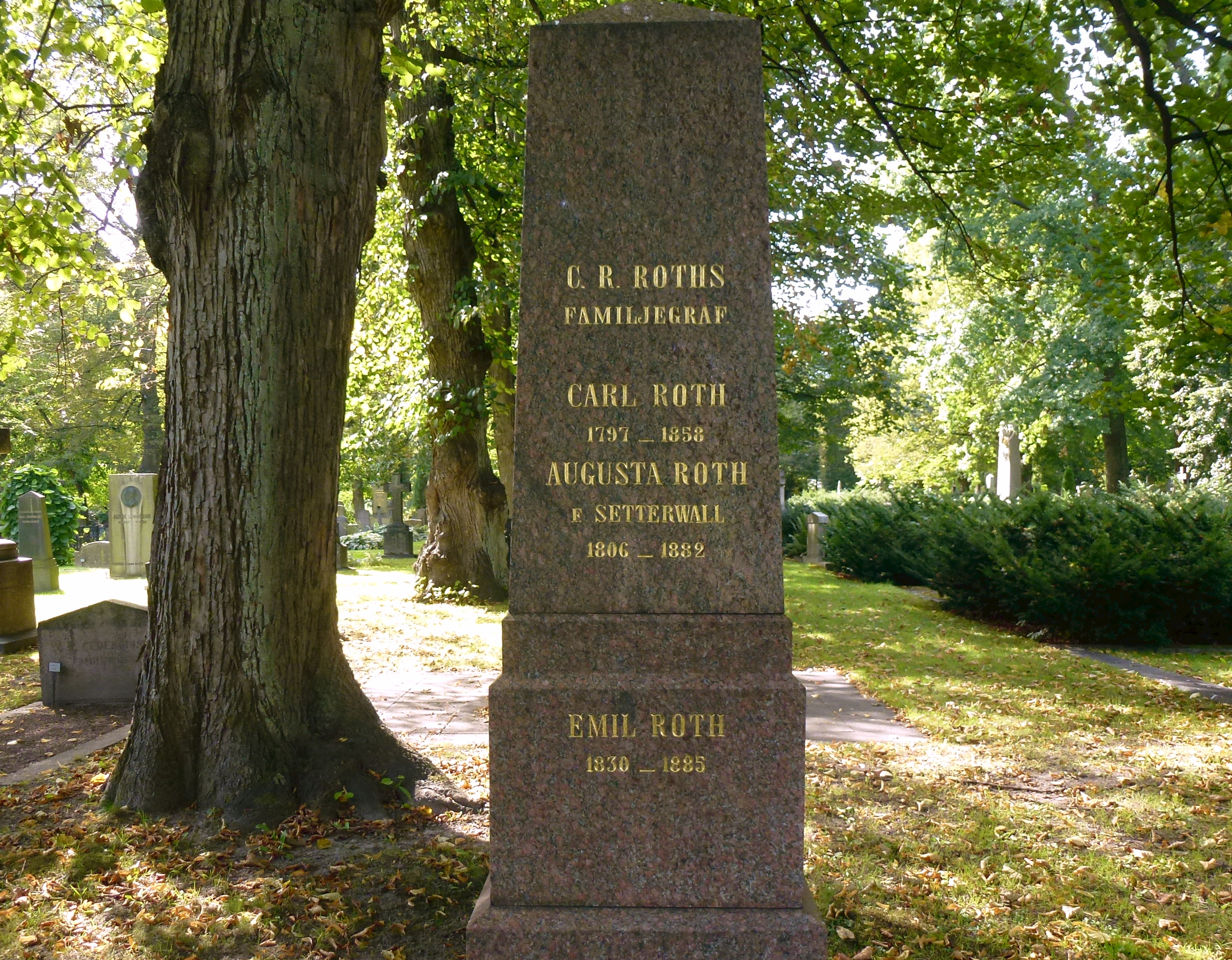
Roths grave at Norra begravningsplatsen in Solna.

Roth family house/maker's mark from Ludvika.
