= Carl Roth of Nedre Fösked =

Swedish blacksmith, farrier, and ironmaster

Carl Roth
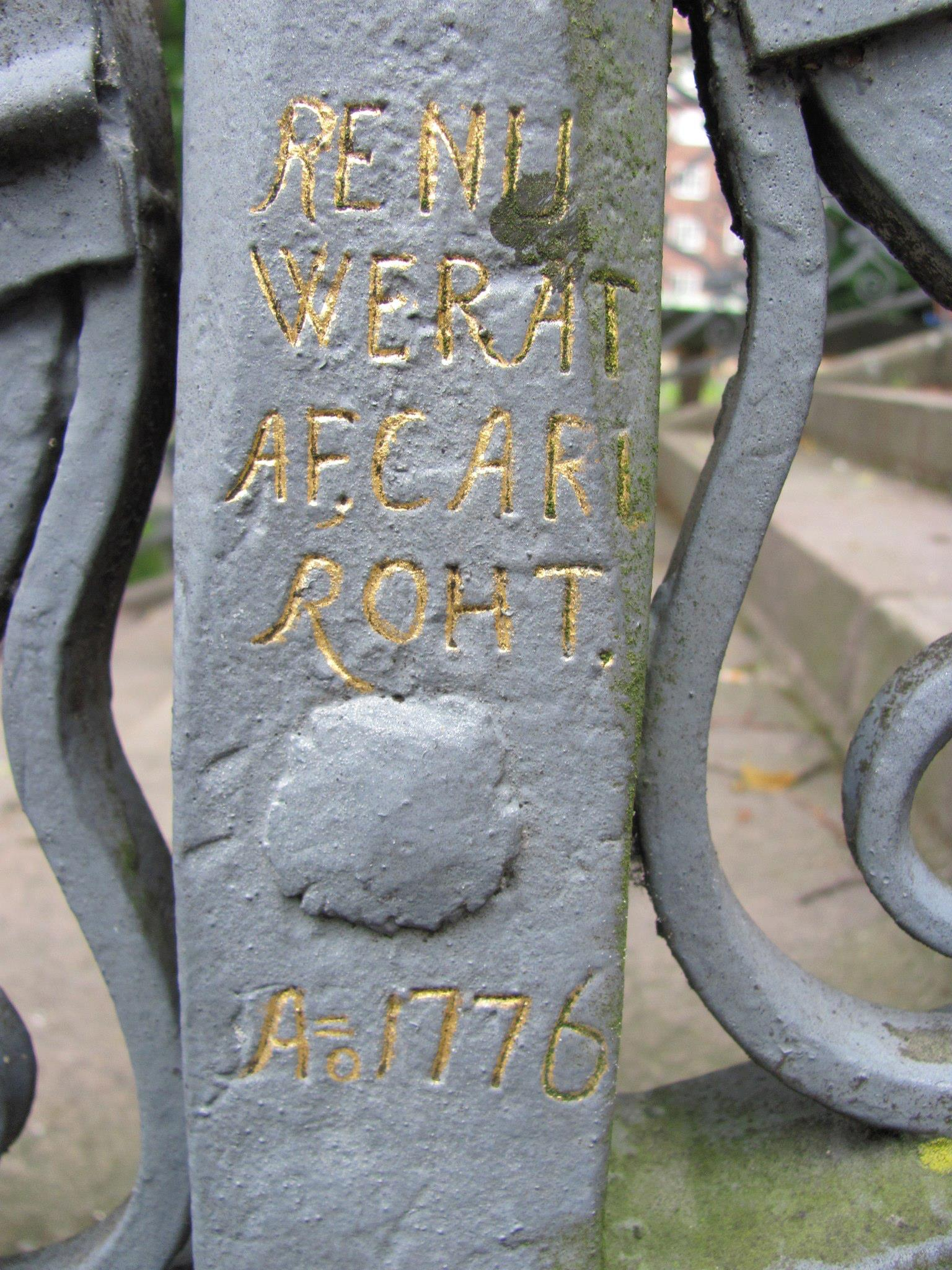
- Markings from Charles XII's Stair
- Born: 1712; Stockholm
- Died: 1788; Nyeds District, Karlstad Municipality, Värmland County, Sweden
- Occupation(s): Blacksmith, Farrier
- Spouse: Agatha Romanians
- Children: Benjamin Roth (1752), Carl Roth II (1753)
- Parent(s): Benjamin Danielsson Roth, Catharina Berg

Carl Roth was a Swedish blacksmith, farrier, and ironmaster who lived during the mid-18th century. He is best known for his work renovating Charles XII's Stair at Katarina Church in Stockholm, Sweden; and as ironmaster of both Duvnäs (Duvenäs), and Nedre Fösked (Föske) ironworks.

== Early life ==
Carl Roth was born in 1712, most likely at one of the residences owned by his father, Benjamin Danielsson Roth, and was christened on 29 July in St. Gertrude's parish in Stockholm. On 24 January 1729, at the age of 17, he enrolled as an apprentice farrier at the workshop where his father was the master. On 17 October 1734, at the age of 22, he was certified as a Journeyman and began traveling Europe for his gesällvandring (Journeyman's Wandering/Years) to improve his craft and work towards his Master-ship. In 1744, at the age of 32, he returned to Stockholm and was certified as a Master Farrier of the Farriers Guild.

== Later life ==
Sometime in the 1750s he married Agatha Romanians, the daughter of bank clerk Olof Romanians and Elsa Flinck. They acquired a home in Packartorget, now called Norrmalmstorg, in Stockholm, where their sons Benjamin and Carl were born. Like his father, Carl was a master in the farrier's guild in Stockholm; but he also worked as a farrier at the royal palace stables.

Sometime between the 1750s and the 1780s Carl purchased the ironworks of Duvnäs and, through a bid at a bank auction, the ironworks and estate of Nedre (Lower) Fösked; both in Nyeds district, Värmland. In 1775 Carl, at the age of 63, returned to Stockholm to renovate Karl XII's stair. The stair had been built by his father in 1715 at Katarina Church in Stockholm. It is not known if he was hired for this work or chose to do so of his own accord. Sometime in the 1780s he and the family moved to Lower Fösked where he lived until his death. It was said that Carl was a man of great strength and endurance and he could, for example, ride all the way between Stockholm and Lower Fösked without stopping to rest (about 375 kilometers). He died in 1788 at Nedre Fösked.
