= Andreas Roth (lawyer) =

German lawyer and professor (born 1956)

Andreas Robert Roth (born July 20, 1956, in Münster) is a German lawyer and professor.

== Biography ==
Roth received his doctorate in 1987 at the University of Münster, he completed his German post-doctorate degree also known as "habilitation" in 1993 at the same university. His habilitation thesis on the fight against crime in major German cities was published in 1997 by the CH Beck publishing house.

Roth has been a professor of legal history and civil law at Johannes University of Mainz since 1994. His research interests include family and criminal law history and family law. Roth is also a member of the Center for Interdisciplinary Forensics at Mainz University.

== Books ==
=== authored ===
- Roth, Andreas. Kollektive Gewalt und Strafrecht: die Geschichte der Massedelikte in Deutschland. Berlin: E. Schmidt, 1989. ISBN 9783503022885
- Roth, Andreas. Verwaltungshandeln mit Drittbetroffenheit und Gesetzesvorbehalt. Berlin: Duncker & Humblot, 1991.ISBN 9783428071654
- Gmür, Rudolf, and Andreas Roth. Grundriss der deutschen Rechtsgeschichte. Neuwied: Luchterhand, 2000. ISBN 9783472043942
- Roth, Andreas. Familien- und Erbrecht mit ausgewählten Verfahrensfragen ein fallbezogenes Examinatorium. 2010. (5th ed) 9783811497771

=== edited ===
- (ed.) Roth, Andreas. 125 Jahre Amtsgerichte im heutigen Rheinland-Pfalz: Vergangenheit - Gegenwart - Zukunft. München: Luchterhand, 2004. ISBN 9783472060727
- (ed) Dodegge, Georg, and Andreas Roth. Systematischer Praxiskommentar Betreuungsrecht. Köln Bundesanzeiger Verlag 2018. 9783846208540
