= Daniel Roth (writer) =

Tech executive and creator

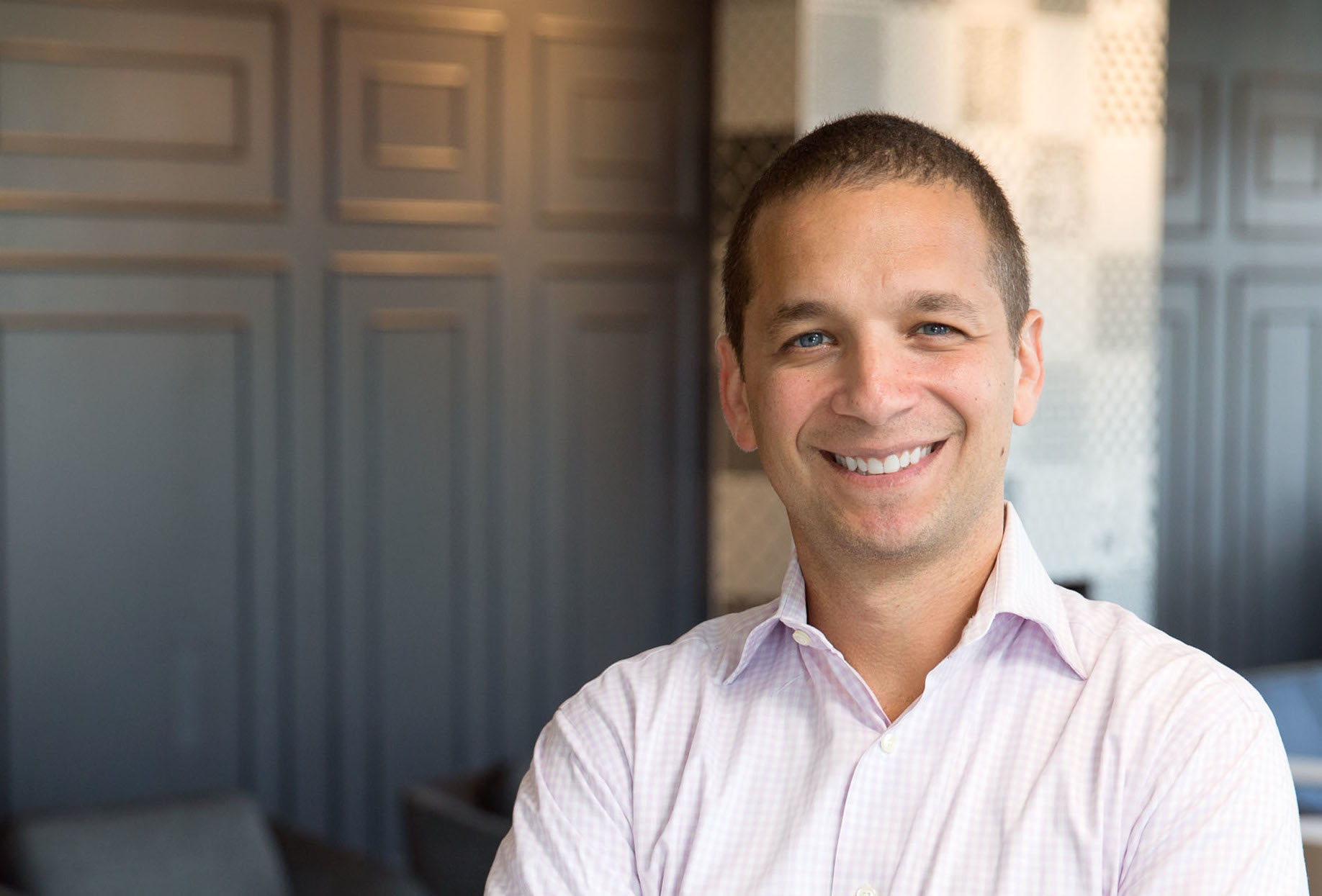
- Roth in his LinkedIn profile picture
- Born: 1973 (age 52–53); Louisville, Kentucky
- Education: Northwestern University
- Occupations: Journalist; Media Executive
- Spouse: Lisa Roth

Daniel Roth (born 1973) is the Editor in Chief and Vice President at LinkedIn. After working as a writer and editor for magazines like Forbes, Fortune, Wired and Conde Nast Portfolio, Roth joined LinkedIn in 2011 to start its editorial operations and now runs its content product and editorial teams. He has built and maintains two iOS apps and is a frequent commentator on AI building.

== Early life and education ==
Roth, originally from Louisville, Kentucky, graduated from Northwestern University's Medill School of Journalism in 1995.

== Career ==
He got his start at The Triangle Business Journal in Raleigh, North Carolina, in 1995.

=== Forbes ===
In 1996 he moved to Forbes in New York where he worked on the Forbes 400, and fact-checked stories.

=== Fortune ===
In 1998 he moved to Fortune where he switched between writing and editing (serving as tech editor from 2001 to 2003) while at the international business biweekly. One of the few journalists to have interviewed Bill Gates and Warren Buffett —at the same time; hung out with Phil Knight and had him run through his time creating Nike as he prepared to step down; traveled cross country with Donald Trump as he searched for the perfect moldings for his Mar-A-Lago ball room. Spent week working for companies as part of the 100 Best Companies to Work for issue (sold gift wrap at the Container Store, delivered packages at FedEx, worked the door at the Four Seasons).

=== Condé Nast Portfolio ===
In 2006, Roth joined Conde Nast to help launch Conde Nast Portfolio, the now shuttered business monthly. He was the first writer hired for what would become Condé Nast Portfolio, a business monthly launched in Spring 2007. He wrote major features ranging from the Barry Sternlicht (founder of Starwood Hotels) and his plans to launch a new hotel empire to Steve Feinberg (founder of Cerberus) and how he planned to turnaround or teardown Chrysler. One of the few journalists to have done extensive interviews with Mohammed bin Rashid Al Maktoum (at his horse track in Dubai).

=== Wired ===
In 2007 he moved to Wired magazine a year later, becoming a senior writer there where he wrote about technology and business, including major profiles of Better Place's Shai Agassi, Netflix's Reed Hastings, Demand Media and others. Some of his articles have been technology-related (iPhone; Comcast's Broadband offerings; Electric Cars) and others have been more eclectic (Financial Recovery; Society and Human/non-Human Rights; Henry Blodget: version 2).

=== Return to Fortune ===
In 2010 he returned to Fortune as managing editor, with the mission of "revitalizing" the magazine's Web site. He was hired to plan and rebuild Fortune.com, which had been shuttered. Staffed up team of writers, editors, bloggers, a designer and product manager. Produced at least 25 stories a day, plus videos, interactive graphics and more—up from about two stories a day in its previous incarnation. Boosted traffic and engagement through story selection, social media, went after new verticals, and rethought what readers want from Fortune online. Oversaw all of Fortune's digital initiatives, including Fortune.com, apps, social, mobile and more.

=== LinkedIn ===
In 2011 he joined LinkedIn where he is the Editor in Chief and VP of LinkedIn, based out of LinkedIn's NYC offices in the Empire State Building. He was hired to help lead its move to a content site; he now leads a newsroom that helps "curate, cultivate and create" professionally relevant articles, posts, videos and voices for 1B+ members of the social network In his role, Roth oversees a team of 200+ editors across the globe – from Amsterdam to Sydney – who handle curation of breaking news and views on LinkedIn; creation of original articles and videos; and the cultivation of new and top contributors across the site. Over the years, he helped build and launch the Influencer program, the 12-country-spanning, 7-language Daily Rundown, the This is Working series and podcast – and other areas of original and curated articles and insights. Business Insider once dubbed him the "most powerful business journalist on the Internet." He has spoken to guests such as Sir Richard Branson, Brene Brown, Sarah Blakely and Mark Cuban. In 2020, the editorial team was renamed the LinkedIn News team. Business Insider once called him the "most powerful business journalist on the Internet". In 2026, LinkedIn combined its Creator Product, Editorial, and LinkedIn Learning Content teams into one Content team under Roth, who is now responsible for all original content and creators on LinkedIn.
