= List of textbooks on classical mechanics and quantum mechanics =

This is a list of notable textbooks on classical mechanics and quantum mechanics arranged according to level and surnames of the authors in alphabetical order.

== Undergraduate ==
=== Classical mechanics ===
- Feynman, Richard P. (2005). The Feynman Lectures on Physics. Vol. 1 (2nd ed.). Addison-Wesley. ISBN 978-0-8053-9065-0.
- Halliday, David; Resnick, Robert (1970). Fundamentals of Physics. John Wiley & Sons. Chapters 1–21. Numerous subsequent editions.
- Hamill, Patrick (2014). A Student's Guide to Lagrangians and Hamiltonians. Cambridge University Press. ISBN 978-1107617520.
- Hand, Louis; Finch, Janet (1998). Analytical Mechanics. Cambridge University Press. ISBN 0521573270.
- Kibble, T. W.; Berkshire, F. H. (2004). Classical Mechanics. Imperial College Press. ISBN 1860944248.
- Kleppner, Daniel; Kolenkow, Robert (1973). An Introduction to Mechanics. McGraw-Hill. ISBN 0-07-035048-5.
- Marion, Jerry; Thornton, Stephen (2003). Classical Dynamics of Particles and Systems (5th ed.). Brooks Cole. ISBN 0534408966.
- Morin, David (2008). Introduction to Classical Mechanics: With Problems and Solutions. Cambridge University Press. ISBN 9780521876223.
- Müller-Kirsten, Harald J.W. (2024). Classical Mechanics and Relativity (2nd ed.). World Scientific. ISBN 9789811287114.
- Schwichtenberg, Jakob (2019). No-Nonsense Classical Mechanics: A Student-Friendly Introduction. No-Nonsense Books. ISBN 978-1096195382.
- Taylor, John (2005). Classical Mechanics. University Science Books. ISBN 978-981-12-8711-4.
- Young, Hugh D.; Freedman, Roger A. (2019). University Physics with Modern Physics (15th ed.). Pearson. ISBN 978-0135159552.

=== Quantum mechanics ===
- Eisberg, Robert; Resnick, Robert (1985). Quantum Physics of Atoms, Molecules, Solids, Nuclei, and Particles (2nd ed.). Wiley & Sons. ISBN 978-0471873730.
- Feynman, Richard P. (2005). The Feynman Lectures on Physics. Vol. 3 (2nd ed.). Addison-Wesley. ISBN 978-0-8053-9065-0.
- French, A. P.; Taylor, Edwin (1978). An Introduction to Quantum Physics. W. W. Norton & Company. ISBN 0393091066.
- Gasiorowicz, Stephen (2003). Quantum Physics (3rd ed.). Wiley. ISBN 978-0471057000.
- Griffiths, David (2005). Introduction to Quantum Mechanics (2nd ed.). Pearson Prentice Hall. ISBN 0131118927.
- McIntyre, David H. (2012). Quantum Mechanics: A Paradigms Approach (1st ed.). Pearson Addison-Wesley. ISBN 978-0-321-76579-6.
- Schwichtenberg, Jakob (2018). No-Nonsense Quantum Mechanics: A Student-Friendly Introduction (2nd ed.). No-Nonsense Books. ISBN 978-1-7904-5538-6.
- Townsend, John (2012). A Modern Approach to Quantum Mechanics (2nd ed.). University Science Books. ISBN 978-1-891389-78-8.
- Zettili, Nouredine (2009). Quantum Mechanics: Concepts and Applications. Chichester, UK: Wiley. ISBN 978-0470026793.
- Binney, James; Skinner, David (2014). The Physics of Quantum Mechanics (1st ed.). Oxford University Press. ISBN 978-0-19-968856-2.

== Advanced undergraduate and graduate ==
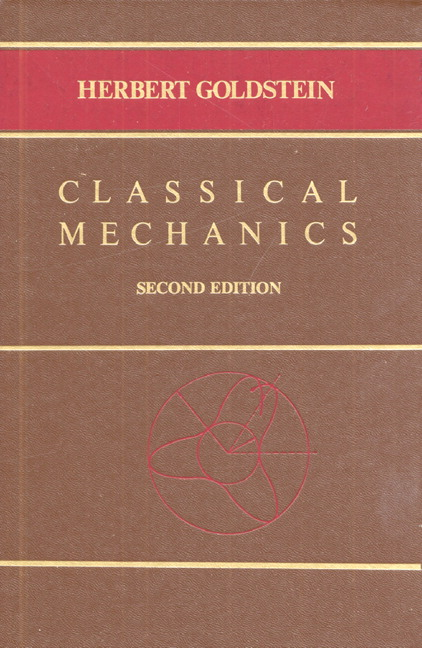
Front cover of the second edition of Herbert Goldstein's Classical Mechanics.

=== Classical mechanics ===
- Abraham, R.; Marsden, J. E. (2008). Foundations of Mechanics: A Mathematical Exposition of Classical Mechanics with an Introduction to the Qualitative Theory of Dynamical Systems (2nd ed.). AMS Chelsea Publishing. ISBN 978-0-8218-4438-0.
- Arnold, V. I. (1997), Mathematical Methods of Classical Mechanics (2nd ed.), Springer-Verlag, ISBN 0-387-96890-3
- Fetter, A. L.; Walecka, J. D. (1980). Theoretical mechanics of particles and continua. New York: McGraw-Hill. ISBN 978-0-07-020658-8. OCLC 6110997.
- Goldstein, H. (1980). Classical Mechanics (2 ed.). Addison-Wesley. ISBN 0201029189.
- Knauf, A. (2018). Mathematical Physics: Classical Mechanics. Springer. ISBN 9783662557723.
- Lanczos, C. (1986). The Variational Principles of Mechanics (4th ed.). Dover Publications. ISBN 0486650677.
- Landau, L. D.; Lifshitz, E. M. (1976). Course of Theoretical Physics Volume 1 - Mechanics. Translated by Sykes, J. B.; Bell, J. S. (3rd ed.). Elsevier. ISBN 0-7506-2896-0.
- Marsden, J. E.; Ratiu, T. S. (1999). Introduction to Mechanics and Symmetry: A Basic Exposition of Classical Mechanical Systems (2nd ed.). Springer. ISBN 978-1-4419-3143-6.
- Papastavridis, J. G. (2014). Analytical Mechanics: A Comprehensive Treatise on the Dynamics of Constrained Systems. World Scientific. ISBN 978-981-4338-71-4.
- Sommerfeld, A. (1952). Mechanics: lectures on theoretical physics. New York: Academic Press Inc. ISBN 978-0-12-654670-5. OCLC 803152309.
- Whittaker, E. T. (1937). A Treatise on the Analytical Dynamics of Particles and Rigid Bodies: With An Introduction to the Problem of Three Bodies (4th ed.). Cambridge University Press. OCLC 222009746.

=== Quantum mechanics ===
- Cohen-Tannoudji, Claude; Diu, Bernard; Laloë, Franck (1977). Quantum Mechanics. Wiley. ISBN 978-0471164333. Three volumes.
- Dirac, Paul (1958). The Principles of Quantum Mechanics (4th ed.). Oxford University Press. ISBN 978-0-198-52011-5.
- Feynman, Richard; Hibbs, Albert (2010). Styer, Daniel (ed.). Quantum Mechanics and Path Integrals. Dover Publications. ISBN 9780486477220.
- Landau, L. D, and Lifshitz, E. M. Course of Theoretical Physics Volume 3 - Quantum Mechanics: Non-Relativistic Theory. Edited by Pitaevskiĭ L. P. Translated by J. B Sykes and J. S Bell, Third edition, revised and enlarged ed., Pergamon Press, 1977. ISBN 0080291406.
- Peres, Asher (1993). Quantum Theory: Concepts and Methods. Kluwer. ISBN 0-7923-2549-4. OCLC 28854083.
- Müller-Kirsten, Harald J.W. (2012). Introduction to Quantum Mechanics: Schrödinger Equation and Path Integral (2nd ed.). World Scientific. ISBN 9789814397735.
- Sakurai, J. J.; Napolitano, Jim (2017). Modern Quantum Mechanics (2nd ed.). Cambridge University Press. ISBN 978-1-108-42241-3.
- Schiff, Leonard (1968). Quantum Mechanics. New York: McGraw-Hill. ISBN 978-0-070-85643-1.
- Shankar, Ramamurti (2011). Principles of Quantum Mechanics (2nd ed.). Plenum Press. ISBN 978-0306447907.
- von Neumann, John (2018). Nicholas A. Wheeler (ed.). Mathematical Foundations of Quantum Mechanics. Translated by Robert T. Beyer. Princeton University Press. ISBN 9781400889921.

=== Relativistic quantum mechanics and quantum field theory ===
- Bjorken, S. Drell, James; Drell, Sidney (1964). Relativistic Quantum Mechanics. McGraw-Hill. ISBN 0-07-005493-2.
- Griffiths, David (2020-12-10). Introduction to Elementary Particles. John Wiley & Sons. ISBN 978-3-527-83464-8.
- Peskin, Michael Edward; Schroeder, Daniel V. (1995). An Introduction to Quantum Field Theory. Reading: Addison-Wesley.
- Schwartz, Matthew (2014). Quantum Field Theory and the Standard Model. Cambridge University Press. ISBN 978-1-107-03473-0.
- Schwichtenberg, Jakob (2020). No-Nonsense Quantum Field Theory: A Student-Friendly Introduction. No-Nonsense Books. ISBN 978-3-948763-01-5.
- Zee, Anthony (2003). Quantum Field Theory in a Nutshell. Princeton, N.J.: Princeton University Press. ISBN 9780691010199. OCLC 50479292.

=== Both quantum and classical mechanics ===
- Byron, Frederick W.; Fuller, Robert W. (1992). Mathematics of Classical and Quantum Physics (Revised ed.). Dover Publications. ISBN 978-0486671642.
- Sears, Francis; Zemansky, Mark; Young, Hugh; Freedman, Roger (2019). University Physics with Modern Physics (15th ed.). Pearson. ISBN 978-0-135-15955-2.
- Thorne, Kip S.; Blandford, Roger D. (2017). Modern Classical Physics: Optics, Fluids, Plasmas, Elasticity, Relativity, and Statistical Physics. Princeton University Press. ISBN 978-0691159027.
- Weinstock, Robert (1974). Calculus of Variations with Applications to Physics and Engineering. Dover Publications. ISBN 978-0486630694.

== See also ==
- List of textbooks in thermodynamics and statistical mechanics
- List of textbooks in electromagnetism
- List of books on general relativity
- Teaching quantum mechanics
