= Magnetic field =

Property of space that quantifies the magnetic influence at a given location

In magnetism and electromagnetism, magnetic field is a physical property of space that quantifies the magnetic influence at a given location.

Magnetic fields

- deflect moving electric charges (including electric currents)
- apply torques on magnets to twist them in the direction of the magnetic field
- attract or repel magnets and magnetic material such as iron
- induce electric currents in electrically conducting material.

Magnetic fields are created by

- permanent magnetic materials
- moving electric charges (including electric current).

Since both strength and direction of a magnetic field may vary with location, it is described mathematically by assigning a vector to each point of space, making it a vector field. (Note: More precisely, magnetic field is a pseudovector field due to its properties under inversion.) There are two different, but closely related, vector fields which together or separately are called "magnetic field". These are written as B and H. (Note: The letters B and H were originally chosen by Maxwell in his Treatise on Electricity and Magnetism (Vol. II, pp. 236–237). For many quantities, he simply started choosing letters from the beginning of the alphabet. See Ralph Baierlein (2000). "Answer to Question #73. S is for entropy, Q is for charge". American Journal of Physics. 68 (8): 691. Bibcode:2000AmJPh..68..691B. doi:10.1119/1.19524.) While the best names for these fields is the subject of long running debate, the underlying physics is uncontested.

In magnetostatics, the magnetic field produced by a steady current distribution is given by the Biot–Savart law, whereas in a time-varying regime, the expression for the magnetic field is given by Jefimenko's equations.

Magnetic fields are used throughout modern science and technology. In electrical engineering and electromechanics, it is important in the design and use of electric motors, generators, transformers, electromagnets, and inductors among many other devices. In material science, magnetic forces give information about the charge carriers in a material through the Hall effect in addition to other uses.

In geology and geophysics, Earth's magnetic field gives information about earth's interior while local magnetic field measurements are used in mineral exploration and other measurements. Too, Earth's magnetic field creates a magnetosphere which shields the Earth's ozone layer and the rest of the planet from the solar wind. In physics, the relationship between the magnetic and electric fields forms the field of electrodynamics which is important to understand a wide range of phenomena including light (also known as electromagnetic radiation) and the properties of antenna and transmission lines.

== Definitions ==
The international ISO 80000-6 standard defines magnetic field as "that component of an electromagnetic field which is characterized by the magnetic field strength vector H and the magnetic flux density vector B." This standard also defines B and H as given in the sections below. While there is wide agreement on these definitions of B and H, there are many alternative names for both (see sidebars in the corresponding sections).

=== The B-field ===
Magnetic flux density (B)
- Other names: Magnetic induction; Magnetic field
- Common symbols: B
- SI unit: tesla (T)
- Other units: gauss; γ (nT); lines per square inch
- In SI base units: kg A^{-1} s^{-2}
- Dimension: T^{-2}MI^{-1}

Also known as magnetic flux density, the magnetic B field causes magnetic forces, magnetic torques and electromagnetic induction. Therefore, it can be defined by any equation that describes these phenomena.

For example, B at any point can be defined as the vector field that, when used in the Lorentz force law, correctly predicts the force on a moving charged particle at that point:

Lorentz force law (vector form, SI units)

$\mathbf{F} = q\mathbf{E} + q(\mathbf{v} \times \mathbf{B})$

Here F is the force on the particle, q is the particle's electric charge, E is the external electric field, v, is the particle's velocity, and × denotes the cross product.

In other words,

[T]he command, "Measure the direction and magnitude of the vector B at such and such a place," calls for the following operations: Take a particle of known charge q. Measure the force on q at rest, to determine E. Then measure the force on the particle when its velocity is v; repeat with v in some other direction. Now find a B that makes the Lorentz force law fit all these results—that is the magnetic field at the place in question.

For more details see Lorentz Force or the § Magnetic force on a charged particle section below.

The SI unit of B is tesla (symbol: T). (Note: The SI unit of Φ_{B} (magnetic flux) is the weber (symbol: Wb), related to the tesla by 1 Wb/m^{2} = 1 T. The SI unit tesla is equal to (newton·second)/(coulomb·metre). This can be seen from the magnetic part of the Lorentz force law.) The Gaussian-cgs unit of B is the gauss (symbol: G). (The conversion is 1 T ≘ 10000 G.) One nanotesla corresponds to 1 gamma (symbol: γ).

=== The H-field ===
Magnetic field strength (H)
- Other names: Magnetic field intensity; Magnetic field; Magnetizing field
- Common symbols: H
- SI unit: Ampere-turn per metre
- Other units: Oersted; Ampere-turn per inch
- In SI base units: A m^{-1}
- Dimension: L^{-1}I

While B creates magnetic forces and torques on objects and induces currents in conducting wires, it is not always easy to calculate. For this reason, it is useful to define a magnetic H field (Note: Griffiths 1999, p. 272 "As it turns out, H is a more useful quantity than D. ... The reason is this: To build an electromagnet you run a certain (free) current through a coil. The current is the thing you read on the dial, and this determines H (or at any rate, the line integral of H)."), also known as magnetic field strength, such that:

Definition of the H field (vector form, SI units)

$\mathbf{H}\equiv\frac{1}{\mu_0}\mathbf{B}-\mathbf{M},$

where $\mu_0$ is the vacuum permeability, and M is the magnetization vector which represents how magnetized a given region of material is and is defined below. In a vacuum, B = μ_{0}H making them equivalent to each other. Inside a material they are different.

Defined this way, H can in many circumstance (Note: The induced component is zero for certain high-symmetry cases where Ampere's law can easily be used and is irrelevant for certain quantities such as those that depend a line integral (over a loop) of the H-field such as in the MMF of magnetic circuits.) be treated as if it is only due to electrical currents with corrections accounting for H due to nearby magnetic material. (Note: This component of H is called the demagnetizing field, or stray field) In any case, B still needs to be calculated from H if forces, torques, induced currents, or energy changes need to be calculated.

The SI unit of H is the ampere per metre (A/m) and the Gaussian unit is the oersted (Oe). One oersted is very close to 1000/4π (≈79.5775) amperes per metre.

== Measurement and visualization ==
=== Magnetometers ===
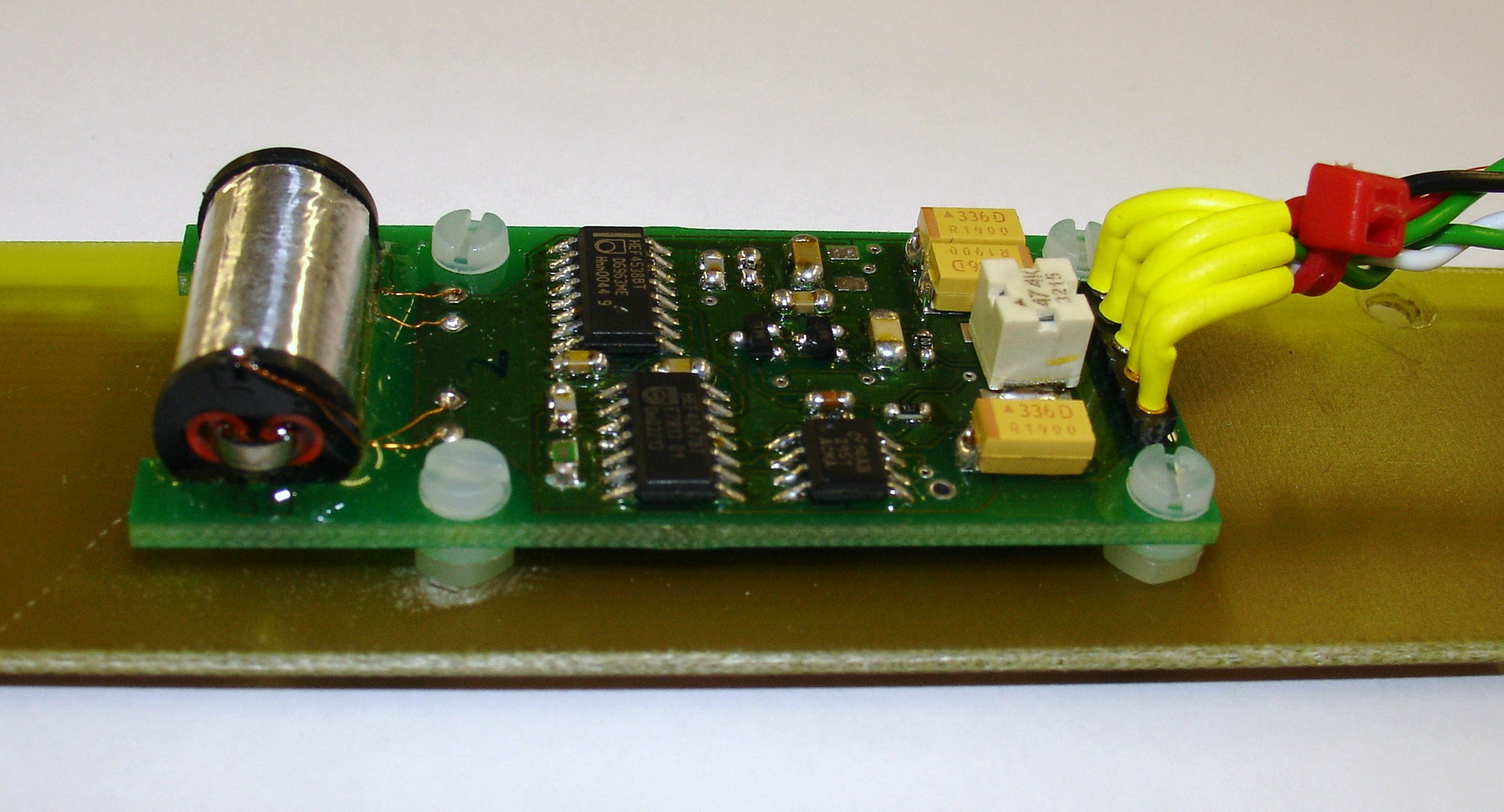
A uniaxial fluxgate magnetometer

Instruments used to measure the local magnetic B-field are known as a magnetometers. Important classes of magnetometers include induction magnetometers (or search-coil magnetometers) which measure only varying magnetic fields, rotating coil magnetometers, Hall effect magnetometers, NMR magnetometers, SQUID magnetometers, and fluxgate magnetometers. The magnetic fields of distant astronomical objects are measured through their effects on local charged particles. For instance, electrons spiraling around a field line produce synchrotron radiation that is detectable in radio waves. The finest precision for a magnetic field measurement was attained by Gravity Probe B at 5 aT (5×10^{−18} T).

The H-field cannot be directly measured but can be inferred from the currents that create it.

=== Magnetic field lines ===
Visualizing magnetic fields
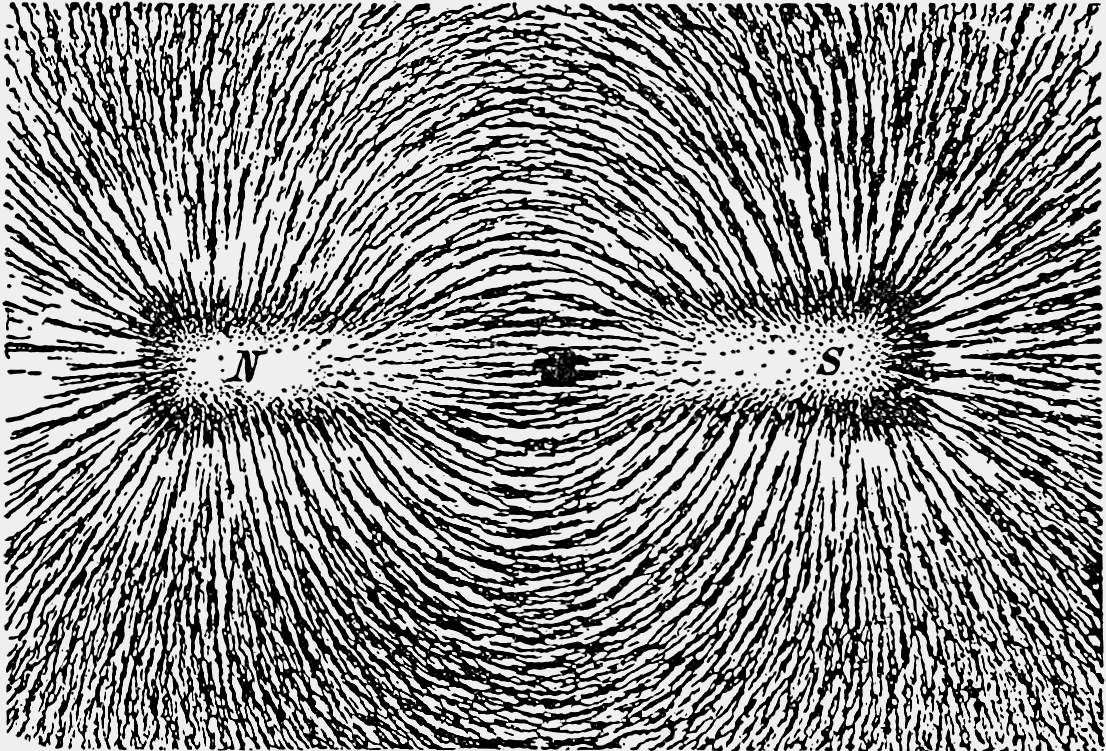
Left: the direction of magnetic field lines represented by iron filings sprinkled on paper placed above a bar magnet.
Right: compass needles point in the direction of the local magnetic field, towards a magnet's south pole and away from its north pole.

Magnetic field can be visualized by a set of magnetic field lines, that follow the direction of the field at each point. The direction of the magnetic field at any point is parallel to the direction of nearby field lines, and the local density of field lines can be made proportional to its strength. Magnetic field lines are like streamlines in fluid flow, in that they represent a continuous distribution, and a different resolution would show more or fewer lines.

Magnetic field lines have the following properties:

- The direction of the magnetic field is tangent to the field line at any point. A small compass points in the direction of the field line.
- The strength of the field is proportional to the closeness of the lines.
- Magnetic field lines never cross.
- Magnetic field lines are directed from the north pole to the south pole.

An advantage of using magnetic field lines as a representation is that many laws of magnetism (and electromagnetism) can be stated completely and concisely using simple concepts such as the "number" of field lines through a surface. These concepts can then be "translated" to their mathematical form. For example, the number of field lines through a given surface is the surface integral of the magnetic field.

=== Different unit systems ===
This article uses the SI unit system. But other unit systems, most importantly the Gaussian unit system (which is the most used system of cgs units for electromagnetism), are still being used in some disciplines, countries, and textbooks. The equations for each unit system can be, and often are, different for different unit systems.

== Force on moving charges and current ==
Moving electric charges including electrical currents experience a force due to magnetic B fields.

=== Magnetic force on a charged particle ===
A charged particle moving with velocity v in a magnetic field B feels a magnetic force F whose direction is determined by the right hand rule.

A charged particle moving in a B-field experiences a sideways force that is proportional to the strength of the magnetic field, the component of the velocity that is perpendicular to the magnetic field and the charge of the particle. This force is known as the Lorentz force, and is given by:

Lorentz force law (vector form, SI units)

$\mathbf{F} = q\mathbf{E} + q(\mathbf{v} \times \mathbf{B}),$

where F is the force, q is the electric charge of the particle, v is the instantaneous velocity of the particle, and B is the magnetic field (in teslas). The direction of force on the charge can be determined by the right-hand rule (see the figure).

The Lorentz force is always perpendicular to both the velocity of the particle and the magnetic field that created it. When a charged particle moves in a static magnetic field, it traces a helical path in which the helix axis is parallel to the magnetic field, and in which the speed of the particle remains constant.

=== Force on current-carrying wire ===
When a wire carrying a steady electric current is placed in an external magnetic field, each of the moving charges in the wire experience the Lorentz force. Together, these forces produce a net macroscopic force on the wire. This force (on a macroscopic current) is often referred to as the Laplace force.

For a straight, stationary wire in a uniform magnetic field, this force is given by:

Magnetic force on straight line current (vector form, SI units)

$\mathbf{F} = I \boldsymbol{\ell} \times \mathbf{B} \, ,$

where I is the current and ℓ is a vector whose magnitude is the length of the wire, and whose direction is along the wire, aligned with the direction of the current.

If the wire is not straight or the magnetic field is non-uniform, the total force can be computed by applying the formula to each infinitesimal segment of wire $\mathrm d \boldsymbol \ell$, then adding up all these forces by integration. In this case, the net force on a stationary wire carrying a steady current is

Magnetic force on current of arbitrary shape (vector form, SI units)

$\mathbf{F} = I\int (\mathrm{d}\boldsymbol{\ell}\times \mathbf{B}) \, .$

This force creates an attractive/repulsive force between 2 parallel wires as the current through each produces a magnetic field that pushes/pulls on the other. Too, a loop of current in a magnetic field will experience a torque due to the different direction of the force on different sides of the loop as describe in the next section.

=== Net force and torque on current loops ===
A rectangular loop of current in a magnetic field,B, experiences a torque (around the dashed line).

A magnetic field acting on a current carrying loop produces both a torque and a net force (if the magnetic field is non-uniform). This effect is important for driving certain types of motors and in modeling forces and torques on atoms.

Calculating the torque on a rectangular loop is straightforward. The diagram to the right shows a rectangular loop of current in a uniform magnetic B field (with a direction indicated by the green arrows). For simplicity the loop is aligned so that it is along the direction of the magnetic field. The magnetic force on opposite sides of the loop are equal and opposite producing no net force on the loop. The forces on the short sides (here shown as violet arrows), though, produce a net torque equal to the product of the force and the perpendicular distance between them. Denoting the short side length as b, the magnitude of that force is F = IBb using the equation for the magnetic force on a straight wire given in the previous section. The magnitude of the net torque (along dashed axis) is therefore N = IabB. Using the fact that the area A = ab and generalizing for all angles gives

Torque on a current loop (vector form, SI units)

$\mathbf{N} = I \mathbf{A}\times \mathbf{B} \, .$

Here the direction of the area A is the normal to the area as determined by the right hand grip rule of the current loop. While derived for a rectangular loop this equation is valid for a flat loop of any shape and orientation. As described above, there is no net force on a loop in a uniform magnetic field. However, non-uniform magnetic fields do produce a net force. This net force tends to pull the object in direction of the stronger magnetic field.

=== Net force and torque on a magnetic dipole ===
Since the net force on a loop is proportional to the current of the loop times it area, it is natural to define a quantity m called the magnetic dipole moment such that

Definition of magnetic dipole moment, m (vector form, SI units)

$\mathbf{m} = I \mathbf{A} \, .$

For a sufficiently small current loop, the details of the current loop such as it shape, area, orientation, and current around the loop are all hidden in m and otherwise do not matter. Such loops are called magnetic dipoles. All magnetic dipoles with the same dipole moment m are affected the same way.

Applying the Lorentz force to a (sufficiently small) current loop of arbitrary shape produces a torque N on the magnetic dipole of:

Torque on a magnetic dipole (vector form, SI units)

$\mathbf{N} = \mathbf{m} \times \mathbf{B}$

and a force F on the magnetic dipole of

Force on a magnetic dipole (vector form, SI units)

$\mathbf{F} = \nabla (\mathbf{m} \cdot \mathbf{B}),$

where $\nabla$ represents the gradient. This force tends to push the magnetic dipole into the direction of increasing B.

== Magnetic field due to electrical currents ==
All moving charged particles produce magnetic fields. Moving point charges, such as electrons, produce complicated but well known magnetic fields that depend on the charge, velocity, and acceleration of the particles. These equations become much simpler when the moving charges form a steady state electrical current, the study of which is called magnetostatics.

=== Magnetic field of a long straight wire ===
Right hand grip rule: a current flowing in the direction of the white arrow produces a magnetic field shown by the red arrows.

In general, magnetic field lines form concentric circles around a current-carrying wire. The direction of such a magnetic field can be determined by using the "right-hand grip rule" (see figure at right). The strength of the magnetic field decreases with distance from the wire. (For an infinite length wire the strength is inversely proportional to the distance.) The magnetic field of a steady current I through a sufficiently long straight wire is:

Magnetic field of infinite wire (vector form, SI units)

$$\begin{align} \mathbf{B} = \frac{\mu_0}{2\pi r}I\, \hat{\phi}, \\
\mathbf{H} = \frac{I}{2\pi r}\, \hat{\phi}, \end{align}$$

where r is the perpendicular distance to the wire. The direction $\hat{\phi}$ of the magnetic field is tangent to a circle perpendicular to the wire according to the right hand rule.

=== Magnetic field of an arbitrarily shaped thin wire ===
The direction of the magnetic flux density dB due to a current of a tiny element Idl varies with location r.

More specifically, the magnetic field generated by a steady current I (a constant flow of electric charges, in which charge neither accumulates nor is depleted at any point) (Note: In practice, the Biot–Savart law and other laws of magnetostatics are often used even when a current changes in time, as long as it does not change too quickly. It is often used, for instance, for standard household currents, which oscillate sixty times per second.) is described by the Biot–Savart law:

Biot-Savart Law (vector form, SI units)

$$\begin{align}\mathbf{B} = \frac{\mu_0I}{4\pi}\int_{\mathrm{wire}}\frac{\mathrm{d}\boldsymbol{\ell} \times \mathbf{\hat r}}{r^2},\\
\mathbf{H} = \frac{I}{4\pi}\int_{\mathrm{wire}}\frac{\mathrm{d}\boldsymbol{\ell} \times \mathbf{\hat r}}{r^2},\end{align}$$

where the integral sums over the wire length where vector dℓ is the vector line element with direction in the same sense as the current I, μ_{0} is the magnetic constant, r is the distance between the location of dℓ and the location where the magnetic field is calculated, and r̂ is a unit vector in the direction of r.

=== Magnetic field of a solenoid ===
A Solenoid with electric current running through it behaves like a magnet.

Bending a current-carrying wire into a loop concentrates the magnetic field inside the loop while weakening it outside. Bending a wire into multiple closely spaced loops to form a coil or 'solenoid' enhances this effect. A device so formed around an iron core may act as an electromagnet, generating a strong, well-controlled magnetic field.

An infinitely long solenoid has a uniform magnetic field inside, and no magnetic field outside. The magnetic field only exists inside of the solenoid and is

Magnetic field of an infinite solenoid (vector form, SI units)

$\mathbf{H} = nI,$

where n is the number of turns per unit length of the solenoid and the direction of H is along the length of the solenoid. A finite length solenoid produces a more complicated magnetic field that can be evaluated mathematically.

For other examples of using the Biot-Savart law to calculate the magnetic fields for other common current configurations see #Common formulæ below.

=== Magnetic field of a flat loop of current (magnetic dipole) ===
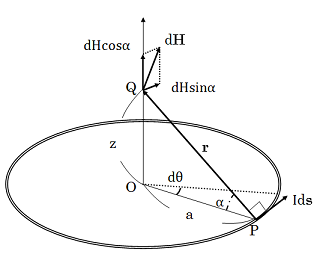
Calculating the magnetic field strength H a distance z directly above the center of a circular current loop of radius a.

The magnetic field of a circular current loop of radius a and carrying a current I can be calculated straightforwardly from the Biot-Savart law for locations a distance z directly above the center of the loop:

Magnetic field at distance z directly above a circular current loop (vector form, SI units)

$$\begin{align} \mathbf{B} & = \mu_0 \frac{\mathbf{m}}{2\pi(a^2 +z^2)^{3/2}} \, , \\
\mathbf{H} & = \frac{\mathbf{m}}{2\pi(R^2 +z^2)^{3/2}} \,, \\
\end{align}$$

where $\mathbf{m} = I \mathbf{A} = I (\pi a^2 \mathbf{\hat{z}})$ is the same magnetic dipole moment used in calculating the force and torque on a loop of current in #Net force and torque on a magnetic dipole above. Calculating the on-axis magnetic fields of a square loop (and other flat geometries) yields similar equations that have the same equation at long distances as the circle: $\mathbf{H} = \frac{\mathbf{m}}{2\pi z^3}$.

Calculating the magnetic field at a arbitrary location r (not just on-axis) from an arbitrarily shaped current loop involves advanced math. But, for sufficiently long distances, the result depends only on the magnetic moment m of that loop and simplifies to:

Magnetic field of magnetic dipole (vector form, SI units)

$\mathbf{H}_{dip}=\frac{1}{4\pi}\left[\frac{3\mathbf{\hat{r}}(\mathbf{m}\cdot\mathbf{\hat{r}})-\mathbf{m}}{r^{3}}\right] = \frac{\mathbf{B}_{dip}}{\mu_0}.$

This equation shows that at sufficiently long distances the detailed geometry of a magnet can be replaced by a single quantity, the magnetic dipole moment m. This equation, therefore makes a good model for the magnetic field of atoms and can be extended to describe magnetic material. Too, it has some utility in calculating the long distance force between magnets.

=== Ampere's law ===
A slightly more general (Note: The Biot–Savart law contains the additional restriction (boundary condition) that the B-field must go to zero fast enough at infinity. It also depends on the divergence of B being zero, which is always valid. (There are no magnetic charges.)) way of relating the current $I$ to the B-field is through Ampère's law:

Ampere's Law (vector form, SI units)

$$\begin{align} \oint \mathbf{B} \cdot \mathrm{d}\boldsymbol{\ell} & = \mu_0 I_{\mathrm{enc}}, \\
\oint \mathbf{H} \cdot \mathrm{d}\boldsymbol{\ell} & = I_{\mathrm{enc}}, \end{align}$$

where the line integral is over any arbitrary loop and $I_\text{enc}$ is the current enclosed by that loop. The $I_\text{enc}$ is slightly different for the 2 equations in that B includes the difficult to calculate bound current in magnetic material while H does not. (Note: The H-field calculated this way does not include that due to magnetic poles which is called the stray field or demagnetizing field and must be calculated separately if needed.) Ampère's law is always valid for steady currents and can be used to easily calculate the magnetic fields of certain highly symmetric situations such as an infinite wire or an infinite solenoid.

In a modified form that accounts for time varying electric fields, Ampère's law is one of four Maxwell's equations that describe electricity and magnetism.

=== Magnetic field of an arbitrary current distribution ===
The magnetic field produced by an arbitrary current distribution was given by Oleg D. Jefimenko in 1966:

Magnetic field of an arbitrary current distribution

$\mathbf{B} = \frac{1}{4\pi\varepsilon_0}\, \displaystyle\iiint \left( \frac{\left[\mathbf{J}\right]\times\mathbf{n}}{c^2 r^2} + \frac{\left[\dot{\mathbf{J}}\right]\times\mathbf{n}}{c^3 r} \right) \, dV'$

with: $[\mathbf{J}]=\mathbf{J}\!\left(t-\displaystyle\frac{r}{c}\right)$ and $\left[\dot{\mathbf{J}}\right]=\dot{\mathbf{J}}\!\left(t-\displaystyle\frac{r}{c}\right).$

== Force between magnets ==
=== Magnets ===
Magnets are objects that both create their own magnetic field and respond to the magnetic field of other magnets and magnetized materials. The interaction between magnets and their interaction with magnetic field is extremely complicated. The correct description involves describing each magnet as being made of many small volumes of magnetic material each of which creates its own magnetic field and responds to the magnetic field of the other volumes. Such models are often extremely complex. Fortunately, in many cases, it is sufficient to understand magnets as objects that have 2 equal but opposite magnetic poles: the magnetic north and south poles. Opposite poles attract with a force that increases with smaller distances while like poles repel in the same way. Such a model is called a magnetic pole model and it, in some cases described below, can be used to make good quantitative predictions.

Specifying the force between magnets is quite complicated because it depends on the strength and orientation of both magnets and their distance and direction relative to each other. The force is particularly sensitive to rotations of the magnets due to magnetic torque. The force on each magnet depends on its magnetic moment and the magnetic field (Note: Either B or H may be used for the magnetic field outside the magnet.) of the other. For short distances (small r) the forces can be quite strong but it decreases quite rapidly (1/r^{4}) for large distances.

=== Force between magnets at long distances (dipole–dipole interaction) ===
For 2 sufficiently small magnets, such as 2 atoms far enough away from each other, the magnetic force can be represented as that of two infinitesimally small dipoles. Using vector notation, the force, F of a magnetic dipole m_{1} on the magnetic dipole m_{2} is:

The magnetic dipole–dipole interaction (vector form, SI units)

$\mathbf{F} = \frac{3 \mu_0}{4 \pi r^5}\left[ (\mathbf{m}_1\cdot\mathbf{r})\mathbf{m}_2 + (\mathbf{m}_2\cdot\mathbf{r})\mathbf{m}_1 + (\mathbf{m}_1\cdot\mathbf{m}_2)\mathbf{r} - \frac{5(\mathbf{m}_1\cdot\mathbf{r})(\mathbf{m}_2\cdot\mathbf{r})}{r^2} \mathbf{r} \right]$

where r is the distance-vector from dipole moment m_{1} to dipole moment m_{2}, with r = ‖r‖. The force acting on m_{1} is in the opposite direction. The net force depends on the orientation of both dipole moments relative to each other and relative to the distance-vector between them and it decreases rapidly (proportional to 1/r^{4}).

=== Force between magnets at moderate distance (Coulomb's law for magnetism) ===
For moderate distances it is often to sufficient model the force between magnets as the H-field of one magnet pushes and pulls on both poles of a second magnet. If this H-field is the same at both poles of the second magnet then there is no net force on that magnet since the force is opposite for opposite poles. If, however, the magnetic field of the first magnet is nonuniform (such as the H near one of its poles), each pole of the second magnet sees a different field and is subject to a different force. This difference in the two forces moves the magnet in the direction of increasing magnetic field and may also cause a net torque.

If both poles are small enough to be represented as single points then they can be considered to be point magnetic charges. Classically, the force F between two magnetic poles is given by:

Coulomb's law for magnetism (force between poles) (vector form, SI units)

$\mathbf{F}={{\mu q_{m1} q_{m2}}\over{4\pi r^2}}\mathbf{\hat{r}}$

where q_{m1} and q_{m2} are the magnetic pole strengths of each magnet (SI unit: ampere-meter), μ is the permeability of the intervening medium, and r is the separation distance between the 2 poles. Note that for 2 magnets (each having 2 poles) the sum of 4 forces is needed: each of the 2 poles of one magnet exerts a separate force on each of the 2 poles of the second magnet.

The pole description is useful to practicing magneticians who design real-world magnets, but real magnets have a pole distribution more complex than a single north and south. Therefore, implementation of the pole idea is not simple. In some cases, one of the more complex formulas given below will be more useful.

=== Magnetic force at small distances (pull force) ===
The mechanical force between two nearby magnetized surfaces can be calculated with the following equation. The equation is valid only for cases in which the effect of fringing is negligible and the volume of the air gap is much smaller than that of the magnetized material, the force for each magnetized surface is:

Magnetic pull between nearly touching magnetic poles (magnetic pole nearly touching iron) (vector form, SI units)

$F=\frac{\mu_0 H^2 A}{2} = \frac{B^2 A}{2 \mu_0}$

where A is the surface area of the magnetic pole and μ_{0} is the permeability of free space. This equation is also valid for the force of a magnetic pole on iron that is either almost touching or touching the magnetic pole.

=== Magnetic torque on permanent magnets ===
If two like poles of two separate magnets are brought near each other, and one of the magnets is allowed to turn, it promptly rotates to align itself with the first. In this example, the magnetic field of the stationary magnet creates a magnetic torque on the magnet that is free to rotate. This magnetic torque N tends to align a magnet's poles with the magnetic field lines. A compass, therefore, turns to align itself with Earth's magnetic field.

Torque on a dipole

In the pole model of a dipole, an H field (to right) causes equal but opposite forces on a N pole (+q) and a S pole (−q) creating a torque.

Equivalently, a B field induces the same torque on a current loop with the same magnetic dipole moment.

Mathematically, the torque N on a small magnet is proportional both to the applied magnetic field and to the magnetic moment m of the magnet:

Magnetic torque (vector form, SI units)

$\boldsymbol{N} = \mathbf{m} \times \mathbf{B}$

where × represents the vector cross product. This equation includes all of the qualitative information included above. There is no torque on a magnet if m is in the same direction as the magnetic field, since the cross product is zero for two vectors that are in the same direction. Further, all other orientations feel a torque that twists them toward the direction of magnetic field.

== Magnetic field due to magnetized material ==
Most materials respond to an applied magnetic field by becoming magnetized (at least temporarily) which causes them to produce their own magnetic field. Typically, the response is weak and exists only when the magnetic field is applied. There are many different types of material that respond differently to the applied magnetic field.

=== Types of magnetic materials ===
The term magnet is typically reserved for objects that produce their own persistent magnetic field even in the absence of an applied magnetic field. Only certain classes of materials can do this. Most materials, however, produce a magnetic field in response to an applied magnetic field – a phenomenon known as magnetism. There are several types of magnetism, and all materials exhibit at least one of them.

The overall magnetic behavior of a material can vary widely, depending on the structure of the material, particularly on its electron configuration. It can also vary with temperature, pressure, and magnetic field strength such that a given material may have more than one magnetic phase. Several forms of magnetic behavior have been observed in different materials, including:

- Diamagnetism produces a magnetization that opposes the magnetic field.
- Paramagnetism produces a magnetization in the same direction as the applied magnetic field.
- Ferromagnetism and the closely related Ferrimagnetism and Antiferromagnetism can produce a magnetization independent of the applied magnetic field with a complicated and often hysteretic relationship. Materials in these states can be used to make permanent magnets.
- Superconductivity (and ferromagnetic superconductors) is characterized by perfect conductivity below a critical temperature and magnetic field. They also are highly magnetic and can be perfect diamagnets below a lower critical magnetic field. Superconductors often have a broad range of temperatures and magnetic fields (the so-named mixed state) under which they exhibit a complicated and often hysteretic relationship between how the material is magnetized and the applied magnetic field.

In the case of paramagnetism and diamagnetism, the relationship between the applied magnetic field and the magnetization is often linear. However, superconductors and ferromagnets have a more complicated relation between the applied magnetic field and magnetization produced (see magnetic hysteresis). Permanent magnets are objects that produce their own persistent magnetic fields. They are made of ferromagnetic (Note: Ferrimagnetic materials, such as magnetite, can also be magnetized.) materials, such as iron and nickel, that have been magnetized.

=== Magnetic dipole moment ===
The Amperian loop model
A current loop (ring) that goes into the page at the x and comes out at the dot produces a B-field (lines). As the radius of the current loop shrinks, the fields produced become identical to an abstract "magnetic dipole" (represented by an arrow pointing to the right).

The magnetic field of magnetized material is created at the atomic level. The proper description of this effect involves quantum mechanics. Fortunately, the net effect of adding up these magnetic interactions can often be calculated using much simpler models for the magnetic field created by the constituent atoms in the magnetic material. This occurs because at large enough distance (or equivalently for small enough magnets) all the magnetic properties of any magnetic object can be described by a single (vector) quantity, the magnetic dipole moment, m. (See § Magnetic field of a flat loop of current (magnetic dipole) and § Net force and torque on a magnetic dipole above). Objects that can be modeled this way, for example atoms, are called magnetic dipoles.

Magnetic dipoles, therefore, are the building blocks of magnetization. The magnetic field produced by magnetized material then is the net magnetic field of these dipoles. Too, the net force (and torque) on a magnetized material is a result of adding up the forces and torques on the individual dipoles that make up the magnetized material.

=== Magnetization ===
The magnetization vector field M represents how strongly a region of material is magnetized. It is defined as the net magnetic dipole moment per unit volume of that region. The magnetization of a uniformly magnetized magnet is therefore a constant, equal to the magnetic moment m of the magnet divided by its volume. Since the SI unit of magnetic moment is A⋅m^{2}, the SI unit of magnetization M is ampere per meter, identical to that of the H-field.

The magnetization M field of a region points in the direction of the average magnetic dipole moment in that region. Magnetization field lines, therefore, begin (inside the magnetized material) near the magnetic south pole and ends (inside the magnetized material) near the magnetic north pole. (Magnetization does not exist outside magnetized material.)

In the Amperian loop model, the magnetization is due to combining many tiny magnetic dipole loops to form a resultant current called bound current. This bound current, then, is the source of the magnetic B field due to the magnet. Given the definition of the magnetic dipole, the magnetization field follows a similar law to that of Ampere's law:

Relation between M and bound current (vector form, SI units)

$\oint \mathbf{M} \cdot \mathrm{d}\boldsymbol{\ell} = I_\mathrm{b} \, ,$

where the integral is a line integral over any closed loop and I_{b} is the bound current enclosed by that closed loop.

Unlike the magnetic B field-lines which cannot begin nor end, magnetization field lines can begin and end. Indeed they must begin and end where they intersects the boundary of the magnetized material (at magnetic poles) because the magnetization field only exists inside of a material. This is analogous to electric field-lines which begin and end at electrical charges. It is therefore possible to define a 'magnetic charge' q_{m} such that for a given region the net 'magnetic charge' is:

Relation between M and fictitious magnetic charge (vector form, SI units)

$\oint_S \mu_0 \mathbf{M} \cdot \mathrm{d}\mathbf{A} = - q_\mathrm{m} \, ,$

where the integral is a closed surface integral over the closed surface S and q_{M} is the "magnetic charge" (in units of magnetic flux) enclosed by S. (A closed surface completely surrounds a region with no holes to let any field lines escape.) The negative sign occurs because the magnetization field moves from south to north. No such magnetic charge exists; rather it is a convenient analogy that allows the use of much of the machinery developed for electrostatics with electric charge to be applied to magnetization with its fictitious magnetic charge. For example the net magnetic charge of a pole is defined as a magnetic pole strength q_{m}.

=== Relation between B, H, and M ===
Comparison of B, H and M inside and outside a cylindrical bar magnet.

Using the above definition of M it is now possible to define the magnetic H field

Definition of H (vector form, SI units)

$\mathbf{H}\ \equiv \ \frac{\mathbf{B}}{\mu_0} - \mathbf{M}.$

From this equation, it is evident that outside of a magnetic material (where $\mathbf{M}=0$) that $\mathbf{B}=\mu_0 \mathbf{H}$. Outside a magnetic material, therefore, B and H are functionally identical just with different units since $\mu_0$ is a constant.

In terms of the H-field, Ampere's law is:

Relation between H and free current (vector form, SI units)

$\oint \mathbf{H} \cdot \mathrm{d}\boldsymbol{\ell} = \oint \left(\frac{\mathbf{B}}{\mu_0} - \mathbf{M}\right) \cdot \mathrm{d}\boldsymbol{\ell} = I_\mathrm{tot} - I_\mathrm{b} = I_\mathrm{f},$

where I_{f} represents the 'free current' enclosed by the loop so that the line integral of H does not depend at all on the bound currents.

Similarly, a surface integral of H over any closed surface is independent of the free currents and picks out the "magnetic charges" within that closed surface:

Relation between H and fictitious magnetic charge (vector form, SI units)

$\oint_S \mu_0 \mathbf{H} \cdot \mathrm{d}\mathbf{A} = \oint_S (\mathbf{B} - \mu_0 \mathbf{M}) \cdot \mathrm{d}\mathbf{A} = 0 - (-q_\mathrm{M}) = q_\mathrm{m} \, ,$

which does not depend on the free currents.

The H-field, therefore, can be separated into two (Note: A third term is needed for changing electric fields and polarization currents; this displacement current term is covered in Maxwell's equations below.) independent parts: $\mathbf{H} = \mathbf{H}_0 + \mathbf{H}_\mathrm{d}$, where H_{0} is the applied magnetic field due only to the free currents and H_{d} is the demagnetizing field due only to the bound currents which can equivalently be expressed in terms of the fictitious magnetic charge q_{m}. The magnetic H-field, therefore, re-factors the bound current in terms of "magnetic charges". The H field lines loop only around "free current" and, unlike the magnetic B field, begins and ends near magnetic poles as well.

=== Constitutive relation between B and H ===
For many materials (particularly diamagnetic and paramagnetic materials) the relationship between B and H is linear:

Constitutive relation between B and H (vector form, SI units)

$\mathbf{B} = \mu \mathbf{H},$

where μ is a material dependent parameter called the permeability. In some cases the permeability may be a second rank tensor so that H may not point in the same direction as B. These relations between B and H are examples of constitutive equations.

=== Boundary conditions for B and H ===
In many real world applications such as small magnetic object inside of an extended applied magnetic field, the constitutive relation is not sufficient even if the material is linear. This is because the H-field that the material experiences is not the same as the H applied. In such cases, the magnetic field can still be calculated but care must be taken to distinguish the change of the magnetic field across the boundary of the magnetic object. These relations in the most simplified form (in terms of H only in a linear material and without any free current) are:

Boundary Conditions for H (no free current) (scalar form, SI units)

$$\begin{align}
H_{1t} & = H_{2t} \, , \\
\mu_1 H_{1N} & = \mu_2 H_{2n} \, ,
\end{align}$$

where the subscript t represents the tangential component of H and n represents its normal component.

== Electrodynamics ==
For time varying magnetic fields (and more generally changing electrical currents or accelerating electrical charges), the magnetic and electric fields become linked such that a change in one induces the other. Together, the electric and magnetic fields form an electromagnetic field. The study of how the electric and magnetic fields interact in this way is called electrodynamics and includes many phenomenon that are important in physics and electrical engineering. It underlies transformers, and the generation and transmission of electrical power through wires and through space in the form of electromagnetic radiation of which light is one form. Too, it allow magnetic fields to store and transmit energy.

=== Magnetic flux rule ===
A time varying magnetic field through a loop of wire induces a current (more properly an EMF) through that loop. This is known as electromagnetic induction and is important for many electronic devices such as inductors, transformers, and electrical generators. The equation governing this is known as the flux rule or Faraday's law of induction:

Magnetic flux rule (Faraday's law of induction) (vector form, SI units)

$\mathcal{E} = - \frac{\mathrm{d}\Phi}{\mathrm{d}t} \, ,$

where $\mathcal{E}$ is the electromotive force (or EMF, the voltage generated around a closed loop) and Φ is the magnetic flux—the product of the area times the magnetic field normal to that area. (This definition of magnetic flux is why B is often referred to as magnetic flux density.) The negative sign represents the fact that any current generated by a changing magnetic field in a coil produces a magnetic field that opposes the change in the magnetic field that induced it. This phenomenon is known as Lenz's law.

=== Stored energy ===
Energy is needed to generate a magnetic field both to work against the electric field that a changing magnetic field creates and to change the magnetization of any material within the magnetic field. The energy density of just creating the field at a given region is:

Magnetic energy density in vacuum (vector form, SI units)

$u_{mag} = \frac{\mathbf{B} \cdot \mathbf{B}}{2\mu_0} \, .$

For non-dispersive materials, the energy used to magnetize the material is released when the magnetic field is destroyed so that the energy can be modeled as being stored in the magnetic field. If the non-dispersive material is also linear (such that B = μH where μ is frequency-independent), then the total energy density stored in the magnetic field and in magnetizing the material at a location is:

Magnetic energy density in linear material (vector form, SI units)

$u_{mag} = \frac{\mathbf{B} \cdot \mathbf{H}}{2}= \frac{\mathbf{B} \cdot \mathbf{B}}{2\mu} = \frac{\mu\mathbf{H} \cdot \mathbf{H}}{2} \, .$

The above equation cannot be used for nonlinear materials, though. In general, the incremental amount of work per unit volume δW needed to cause a small change of magnetic field δB is:

Differential work done (per unit volume) in creating a magnetic field in the presence of a material (vector form, SI units)

$\delta W = \mathbf{H}\cdot\delta\mathbf{B} \, .$

Once the relationship between H and B is known this equation is used to determine the work needed to reach a given magnetic state. For hysteretic materials such as ferromagnets and superconductors, the work needed also depends on how the magnetic field is created. For linear non-dispersive materials, though, the general equation leads directly to the simpler energy density equation given above.

=== Poynting vector ===
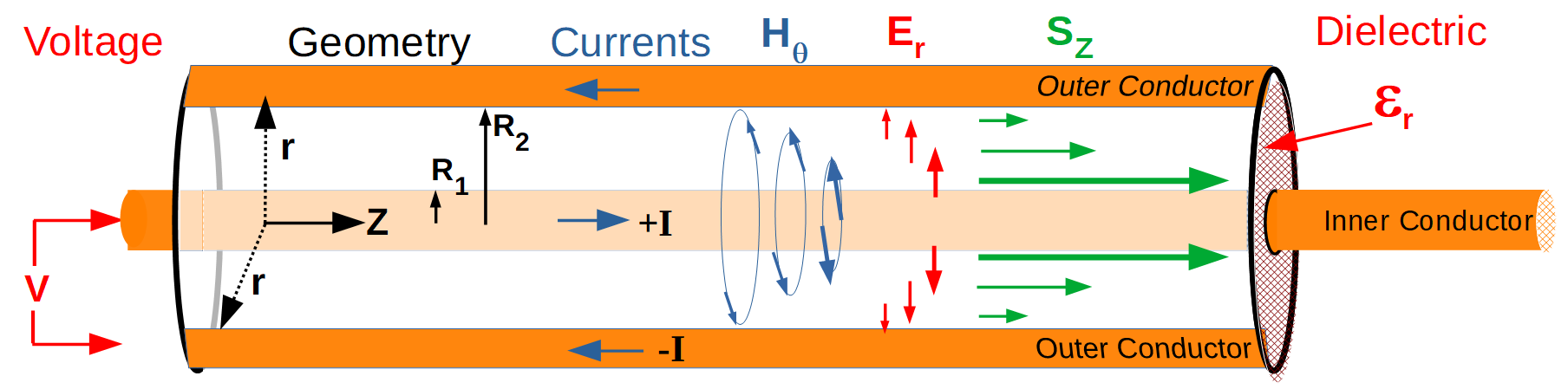
Illustration of electromagnetic power flow inside a coaxial cable according to the Poynting vector S, calculated using the electric field E (due to the voltage V) and the magnetic field H (due to current I).

Magnetic field, together with the electric field, transmit electrical power. The amount of electrical power (per unit area) transmitted this way is called the poynting vector, S, which depends on the magnetic field as the cross product:

The Poynting vector (power per unit area passing a given point) (vector form, SI units)

$$\mathbf{S} = \mathbf{E} \times \mathbf{H} \, ,$$

where E is the electric field. Note that this power includes both the power transmitted by the electric and magnetic fields and the energy absorbed and emitted by magnetizing and polarizing the material. Too, this equation only works for linear non-dispersive materials. This equations is also valid in a vacuum where H = B/μ_{0}.

The time average of the poynting vector is known as irradiance and is an important quantity in optics that describes how intense light is at a given point.

=== Maxwell's equations ===
It is sometimes useful to calculate the magnetic field for a given set of time varying charges and currents, without having to use the complicated equations used to directly calculate it. An example of this is calculating the magnetic field of a light wave as it reflects and refracts at a surface. In such cases Maxwell's equations are used to solve for both the magnetic and electric fields. (In electrodynamics the electric and magnetic fields are coupled.)

Maxwell's equations are a powerful set of differential equations that allows the calculation of the magnetic and electric fields for simple (and complex using computers and Finite Element Analysis) geometries. Maxwell's Equations together with the Lorentz force law form a complete description of classical electrodynamics including both electricity and magnetism.

Maxwell's equations takes advantage of the fact that all vector fields (such as the electric and magnetic fields) can be expressed in terms of 2 types of sources and an appropriate set of boundary conditions. (Note: See Helmholtz decomposition#Three-dimensional space.) The first type of source (an outflow source) causes the vector field to flow out (or in for a sink) to a given point. The second (or circulation) source causes the vector field to rotate around a given point (forming vortices). Both of these sources have well defined definitions and can be calculated from the vector field they create using a well-understood vector operator.

The divergence of a vector field A, ∇ · A is defined such that applying the divergence operator to a given vector field will yield the outflow sources. The curl is defined such that ∇ × A yields the circulation source. An example of the power of these vector operators is: since it is an experimental fact that magnetic charges do not exist (and therefore there are no source nor sinks of B) the divergence of B must be zero, ∇ · B = 0, which is one of Maxwell's equations.

Maxwell's equation has 2 major versions: a microscopic version which necessitates knowing all of the charges and currents (including the complex ones at the atomic level) and the macroscopic version which depends only on the know 'free' charge and 'free' currents. Here the term 'free' means any charge or current that is directly controlled by the experiment and does not include the atomic level 'bound' charges and currents in a material which happen as a response to the electric and magnetic fields present in that material.

Maxwell's macroscopic equations are written as:

Maxwell's equations in matter (vector form, SI units)

$$\begin{align}
\nabla \cdot \mathbf{D} \,\,\, &= \rho_f \\
\nabla \cdot \mathbf{B} \,\,\, &= 0 \\
\nabla \times \mathbf{E} &= -\frac{\partial \mathbf{B}}{\partial t} \\
\nabla \times \mathbf{H} &= \mathbf{J}_f +  \frac{\partial \mathbf{D}}{\partial t} \, .
\end{align}$$

In these equations, $\mathbf{D}$ is the electric displacement field, $\mathbf{E}$ the electric field, $\rho_f$ the free electric charge density, and $\mathbf{J}_f$ the free current density.

The first of Maxwell's equations is known as Gauss' Law but does not involve magnetic field so does not warrant further discussion here. The second equation is Gauss' law for magnetism which reflects the non-existence of magnetic charge and allows B to be determined as the curl of a vector potential A. The third equation is Faraday's law of induction. And, the fourth equation is Ampère's law with Maxwell's correction.

== Advanced formulations ==
=== Magnetic vector potential ===
Summary of magnetostatic relations between magnetic vector potential, A, magnetic flux density, B, and current density, J. Here, $\mathbf r = \mathbf x - \mathbf{x'}$.

In deriving advanced equations and in advanced topics such as quantum mechanics and relativity, it is often easier to work with a potential formulation of electrodynamics rather than in terms of the electric and magnetic fields. In this representation, the magnetic vector potential A, and the electric scalar potential φ, are defined such that:

Definition of the vector A and scalar φ potentials (vector form, SI units)

$$\begin{align}
\mathbf{B} &=  \nabla \times \mathbf{A}, \\
\mathbf{E} &= -\nabla \varphi - \frac{ \partial \mathbf{A} }{ \partial t }.
\end{align}$$

The vector potential, A given by this form may be interpreted as a generalized potential momentum per unit charge just as φ is interpreted as a generalized potential energy per unit charge. There are multiple choices one can make for the potential fields that satisfy the above condition. However, the choice of potentials is represented by its respective gauge condition.

Maxwell's equations when expressed in terms of the potentials can be cast into a form that explicitly agrees with special relativity. Together, A and φ form the four-potential. Using the four potential instead of electric and magnetic fields is much simpler—and it can be easily adapted to work with quantum mechanics.

=== Magnetic and electric fields are different aspects of the same phenomenon ===
Magnetic field is inherently a relativistic phenomena. More specifically, both electric and magnetic fields are the same phenomenon as seen in different reference frames: An electric force perceived by one observer may be perceived by another (in a different frame of reference) as a magnetic force, or a mixture of electric and magnetic forces. (Here different reference frames means one reference frame is moving relative to the other.) For relativistic phenomena, a lorentz transformation must be used to move (or transform) from one reference system to another.

It is a straightforward task to show how the electric and magnetic fields transform from one reference frame to another. The transformation rules, however are quite messy. One simple example is to examine how Coulomb's Law (which is a pure electric field of a charged particle in it own rest frame) transforms to a moving reference frame. A point in the moving reference frame will experience a magnetic field of:

Magnetic (and electric) field of a uniformly moving point charge (vector form, SI units)

$\mathbf{B} = \frac q {4 \pi \varepsilon_0 r^3} \frac {1- \beta^2} {(1- \beta^2 \sin^2 \theta)^{3/2}} \frac{\mathbf{v} \times \mathbf{r}}{c^2} = \frac{\mathbf{v} \times \mathbf{E}}{c^2} \, ,$

where $q$ is the charge of the point source, $\varepsilon_0$ is the vacuum permittivity, $\mathbf{r}$ is the position vector from the point source to the point in space, $\mathbf{v}$ is the velocity vector of the charged particle, $\beta$ is the ratio of speed of the charged particle divided by the speed of light and $\theta$ is the angle between $\mathbf{r}$ and $\mathbf{v}$.

Formally, special relativity combines the electric and magnetic fields into a rank-2 tensor, called the electromagnetic tensor. Changing reference frames mixes these components. This is analogous to the way that special relativity mixes space and time into spacetime, and mass, momentum, and energy into four-momentum. Similarly, the energy stored in a magnetic field is mixed with the energy stored in an electric field in the electromagnetic stress–energy tensor.

=== Magnetic field of arbitrarily moving point charge ===
The solution of maxwell's equations for electric and magnetic field of a point charge is expressed in terms of retarded time or the time at which the particle in the past causes the field at the point, given that the influence travels across space at the speed of light. The retarded time for a point particle is given as solution of:

Definition of retarded time (which enforces causality) (vector form, SI units)

$t_r = \mathbf{t} - \frac{\left|\mathbf{r} - \mathbf{r}_s(t_r)\right|}{c} \, ,$

where the retarded time $t_r$ is the time at which the source's contribution of the field originated, $r_s(t)$ is the position vector of the particle as function of time, $\mathbf{r}$ is the point in space, $\mathbf{t}$ is the time at which fields are measured and $c$ is the speed of light. Any arbitrary motion of point charge causes electric and magnetic fields as follows:

Magnetic (and electric) field of an arbitrarily moving point charge (vector form, SI units)

$$\begin{align}
\mathbf{B}(\mathbf{r}, \mathbf{t}) &= \frac{\mu_0}{4 \pi} \left[
\frac{q c(\boldsymbol{\beta}_s \times \mathbf{n}_s)}{\gamma^2 {\left(1 - \mathbf{n}_s \cdot \boldsymbol{\beta}_s\right)}^3 {\left|\mathbf{r} - \mathbf{r}_s\right|}^2}
+ \frac{q \mathbf{n}_s \times \left(\mathbf{n}_s \times \left(\left(\mathbf{n}_s - \boldsymbol{\beta}_s\right) \times \dot{\boldsymbol{\beta}_s}\right) \right)}{{\left(1 - \mathbf{n}_s \cdot \boldsymbol{\beta}_s\right)}^3 \left|\mathbf{r} - \mathbf{r}_s\right|} \right]_{t=t_r} \\[1ex]
&= \frac{\mathbf{n}_s(t_r)}{c} \times \mathbf{E}(\mathbf{r}, \mathbf{t} \, ,)
\end{align}$$

where q is the charge of the point source, $n_s$ is a unit vector pointing from charged particle to the point in space, $\boldsymbol{\beta}_s(t)$ is the velocity of the particle divided by the speed of light and $\gamma (t)$ is the corresponding Lorentz factor.

=== Quantum electrodynamics ===
The classical electromagnetic field incorporated into quantum mechanics forms what is known as the semi-classical theory of radiation. However, it is not able to make experimentally observed predictions such as spontaneous emission process or Lamb shift implying the need for quantization of fields. In modern physics, the electromagnetic field is understood to be not a classical field, but rather a quantum field; it is represented not as a vector of three numbers at each point, but as a vector of three quantum operators at each point. The most accurate modern description of the electromagnetic interaction (and much else) is quantum electrodynamics (QED), which is incorporated into a more complete theory known as the Standard Model of particle physics.

In QED, the magnitude of the electromagnetic interactions between charged particles (and their antiparticles) is computed using perturbation theory. These rather complex formulas produce a remarkable pictorial representation as Feynman diagrams in which virtual photons are exchanged.

Predictions of QED agree with experiments to an extremely high degree of accuracy: currently about 10^{−12} (and limited by experimental errors); for details see precision tests of QED. This makes QED one of the most accurate physical theories constructed thus far.

All equations in this article are in the classical approximation, which is less accurate than the quantum description mentioned here. However, under most everyday circumstances, the difference between the two theories is negligible.

== Applications ==
=== Uses in geology ===
==== Earth's magnetic field ====
A sketch of Earth's magnetic field representing the source of the field as a magnet. The south pole of the magnetic field is near the geographic north pole of the Earth.

The Earth's magnetic field is produced by convection of a liquid iron alloy in the outer core. In a dynamo process, the movements drive a feedback process in which electric currents create electric and magnetic fields that in turn act on the currents.

The field at the surface of the Earth is approximately the same as if a giant bar magnet were positioned at the center of the Earth and tilted at an angle of about 11° off the rotational axis of the Earth (see the figure). The north pole of a magnetic compass needle points roughly north, toward the North Magnetic Pole. However, because a magnetic pole is attracted to its opposite, the North Magnetic Pole is actually the south pole of the geomagnetic field. This confusion in terminology arises because the pole of a magnet is defined by the geographical direction it points.

Earth's magnetic field is not constant—the strength of the field and the location of its poles vary. Moreover, the poles periodically reverse their orientation in a process called geomagnetic reversal. The most recent reversal occurred 780,000 years ago.

==== Magnetic surveys ====
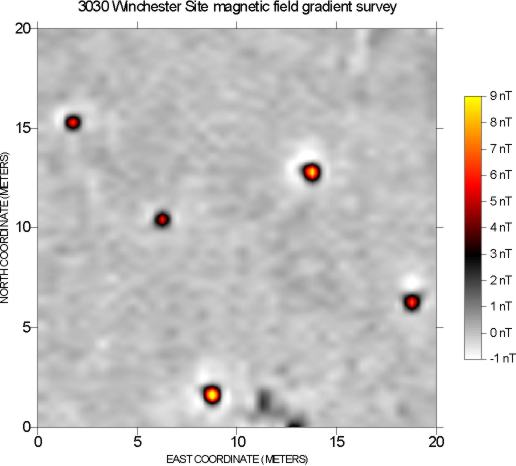
Magnetic gradiometer map of Prehistoric fire-hearths

Magnetic surveying is one of a number of methods used in archaeological geophysics. Magnetic surveys record spatial variation in the Earth's magnetic field. In archaeology, magnetic surveys are used to detect and map archaeological artefacts and features. Magnetic surveys are used in both terrestrial and marine archaeology. In terrestrial archaeology, magnetic surveys are typically used for detailed mapping of archaeological features on known archaeological sites. More exceptionally, magnetometers are used for low-resolution exploratory surveys. Magnetic survey help to prove that a survey area has the potential for more detailed studies and scientific excavation. Magnetic surveys are extremely useful in the excavation and exploration of underwater archaeological sites. In maritime archaeology, these are often used to map the geology of wreck sites and determine the composition of magnetic materials found on the seafloor.

Measuring the Earths' magnetic field is a very useful tool in mineral exploration, oil exploration, and geological mapping. To cover large areas with uniform data, aircraft such as helicopters, airplanes, and drones are employed. The amount of detail is a function of flight height and sample density, in addition to instrument sensitivity. For surveys, drones are used which helps greatly in the process. Aeromagnetic surveys are also used to perform reconnaissance mapping of unexploded ordnance.

=== Uses in engineering ===
==== Rotating magnetic fields ====
The rotating magnetic field is a common design principle in the operation of alternating-current motors. A permanent magnet in such a field rotates so as to maintain its alignment with the external field.

Magnetic torque is used to drive electric motors. In one simple motor design, a magnet is fixed to a freely rotating shaft and is subjected to a magnetic field from an array of electromagnets. By continuously switching the electric current through each of the electromagnets, thereby flipping the polarity of their magnetic fields, like poles are kept next to the rotor; the resultant torque is transferred to the shaft.

A rotating magnetic field can be constructed using two coils at right angles with a phase difference of 90 degrees between their AC currents. In practice, three-phase systems are used where the three currents are equal in magnitude and have a phase difference of 120 degrees. Three similar coils at mutual geometrical angles of 120 degrees create the rotating magnetic field. The ability of the three-phase system to create a rotating field, utilized in electric motors, is one of the main reasons why three-phase systems dominate the world's electrical power supply systems.

Synchronous motors use DC-voltage-fed rotor windings, which lets the excitation of the machine be controlled—and induction motors use short-circuited rotors (instead of a magnet) following the rotating magnetic field of a multicoiled stator. The short-circuited turns of the rotor develop eddy currents induced by the rotating field of the stator, and these currents in turn produce a torque on the rotor through the Lorentz force.

The Italian physicist Galileo Ferraris and the Serbian-American electrical engineer Nikola Tesla independently researched the use of rotating magnetic fields in electric motors. In 1888, Ferraris published his research in a paper to the Royal Academy of Sciences in Turin and Tesla gained U.S. patent 381,968 for his work.

==== Magnetic circuits ====
Magnetic circuit

An important use of H is in magnetic circuits. A magnetic circuit is made up of one or more closed loop paths containing a magnetic flux. The flux is usually generated by permanent magnets or electromagnets and confined to the path by magnetic cores consisting of ferromagnetic materials like iron, although there may be air gaps or other materials in the path. Magnetic circuits are employed to efficiently channel magnetic fields in many devices such as electric motors, generators, transformers, relays, lifting electromagnets, SQUIDs, galvanometers, and magnetic recording heads.

The relation between the magnetic properties of a magnetic circuit can be described by Hopkinson's law, which bears a superficial resemblance to Ohm's law in electrical circuits, resulting in a one-to-one correspondence between properties of a magnetic circuit and an analogous electric circuit. Using this concept the magnetic fields of complex devices such as transformers can be quickly solved using the methods and techniques developed for electrical circuits. Hopkinson's law is:

Hopkinson's Law

$\Phi = \frac F R_\mathrm{m},$

where $\Phi = \int \mathbf{B}\cdot \mathrm{d}\mathbf{A}$ is the magnetic flux in the circuit, $F = \int \mathbf{H}\cdot \mathrm{d}\boldsymbol{\ell}$ is the magnetomotive force applied to the circuit, and R_{m} is the magnetic reluctance of the circuit. Here the reluctance R_{m} is a quantity similar in nature to resistance for the flux. Using this analogy it is straightforward to calculate the magnetic flux of complicated magnetic field geometries, by using all the available techniques of circuit theory.

==== Magnetic levitation ====
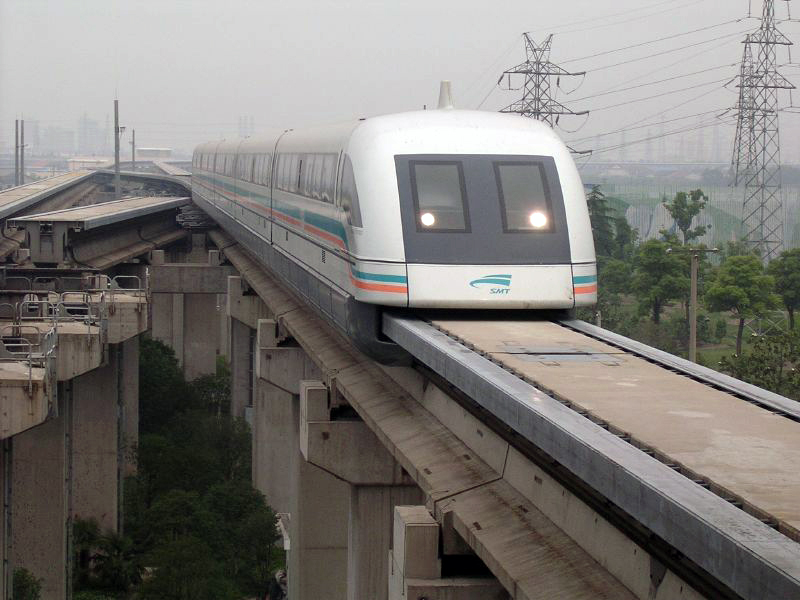
The Transrapid system uses servomechanisms to pull the train up from underneath the track and maintains a constant gap while travelling at high speed

Magnetic levitation (maglev) or magnetic suspension is a method by which an object is suspended with no support other than magnetic fields. Magnetic force is used to counteract the effects of the gravitational force and any other forces. The two primary issues involved in magnetic levitation are (a) lifting forces – providing an upward force sufficient to counteract gravity, and (b) stability – ensuring that the system does not spontaneously slide or flip into a configuration where the lift is neutralized.

Magnetic levitation is used for maglev trains, contactless melting, magnetic bearings, and for product display purposes.

=== Uses in material science ===
Magnetic field affects materials in a large number of ways.

==== Hall effect ====
The charge carriers of a current-carrying conductor placed in a transverse magnetic field experience a sideways Lorentz force; this results in a charge separation in a direction perpendicular to the current and to the magnetic field. The resultant voltage in that direction is proportional to the applied magnetic field. This is known as the Hall effect.

The Hall effect is often used to measure the magnitude of a magnetic field. It is used as well to find the sign of the dominant charge carriers in materials such as semiconductors (negative electrons or positive holes).

=== Largest magnitude magnetic fields ===
The largest magnitude magnetic field produced over a macroscopic volume outside a lab setting is 2.8 kT (VNIIEF in Sarov, Russia, 1998). The largest magnitude magnetic field produced in a laboratory over a macroscopic volume was 1.2 kT by researchers at the University of Tokyo in 2018. The largest magnitude microscopic magnetic fields produced in a laboratory occur in particle accelerators, such as RHIC, inside the collisions of heavy ions, where microscopic fields reach 10^{14} T. Magnetars have the strongest known macroscopic magnetic fields of any naturally occurring object, ranging from 0.1 to 100 GT (10^{8} to 10^{11} T).

== Common formulæ ==
Steady current configuration	Figure	Magnetic field	
Finite beam of current		$B=\frac{\mu_0I}{4\pi x}(\cos \theta_1+\cos\theta_2)$ where $I$ is the uniform current throughout the beam, with the direction of magnetic field as shown.	
Infinite wire		$B = \frac{\mu_0I}{2\pi x}$ where $I$ is the uniform current flowing through the wire with the direction of magnetic field as shown.	
Infinite cylindrical wire		$B = \frac{\mu_0I}{2\pi x}$ outside the wire carrying a current $I$ uniformly, with the direction of magnetic field as shown.	$B = \frac{\mu_0Ix}{2\pi R^2}$ inside the wire carrying a current $I$ uniformly, with the direction of magnetic field as shown.
Circular loop		$\mathbf B = \frac{\mu_0IR^2}{2(x^2+R^2)^{3/2}}\hat\mathbf x$ along the axis of the loop, where $I$ is the uniform current flowing through the loop.	
Solenoid		$B=\frac{\mu_0nI}2(\cos\theta_1+\cos\theta_2)$ along the axis of the solenoid carrying current $I$ with $n$, uniform number of loops of currents per length of solenoid; and the direction of magnetic field as shown.	
Infinite solenoid		$\mathbf B=0$ outside the solenoid carrying current $I$ with $n$, uniform number of loops of currents per length of solenoid.	$B = \mu_0 n I$ inside the solenoid carrying current $I$ with $n$, uniform number of loops of currents per length of solenoid, with the direction of magnetic field as shown.
Circular Toroid		$B = \frac{\mu_0NI}{2\pi R}$ along the bulk of the circular toroid carrying uniform current $I$ through $N$ number of uniformly distributed poloidal loops, with the direction of magnetic field as indicated.	
Magnetic Dipole		$\mathbf B = -\frac{\mu_0\mathbf m}{4\pi r^3},$ on the equatorial plane, where $\mathbf m$ is the magnetic dipole moment.	$\mathbf B = \frac{\mu_0\mathbf m}{2\pi {|x|}^3},$ on the axial plane (given that $x \gg R$), where $x$ can also be negative to indicate position at the opposite direction on the axis, and $\mathbf m$ is the magnetic dipole moment.

Additional magnetic field values can be found through the magnetic field of a finite beam, for example, that the magnetic field of an arc of angle $\theta$ and radius $R$ at the center is $B={\mu_0\theta I\over 4\pi R}$, or that the magnetic field at the center of a N-sided regular polygon of side $a$ is $B= {\mu_0NI\over\pi a} \sin{\pi\over N}\tan{\pi\over N}$, both outside of the plane with proper directions as inferred by right hand thumb rule.

== History ==
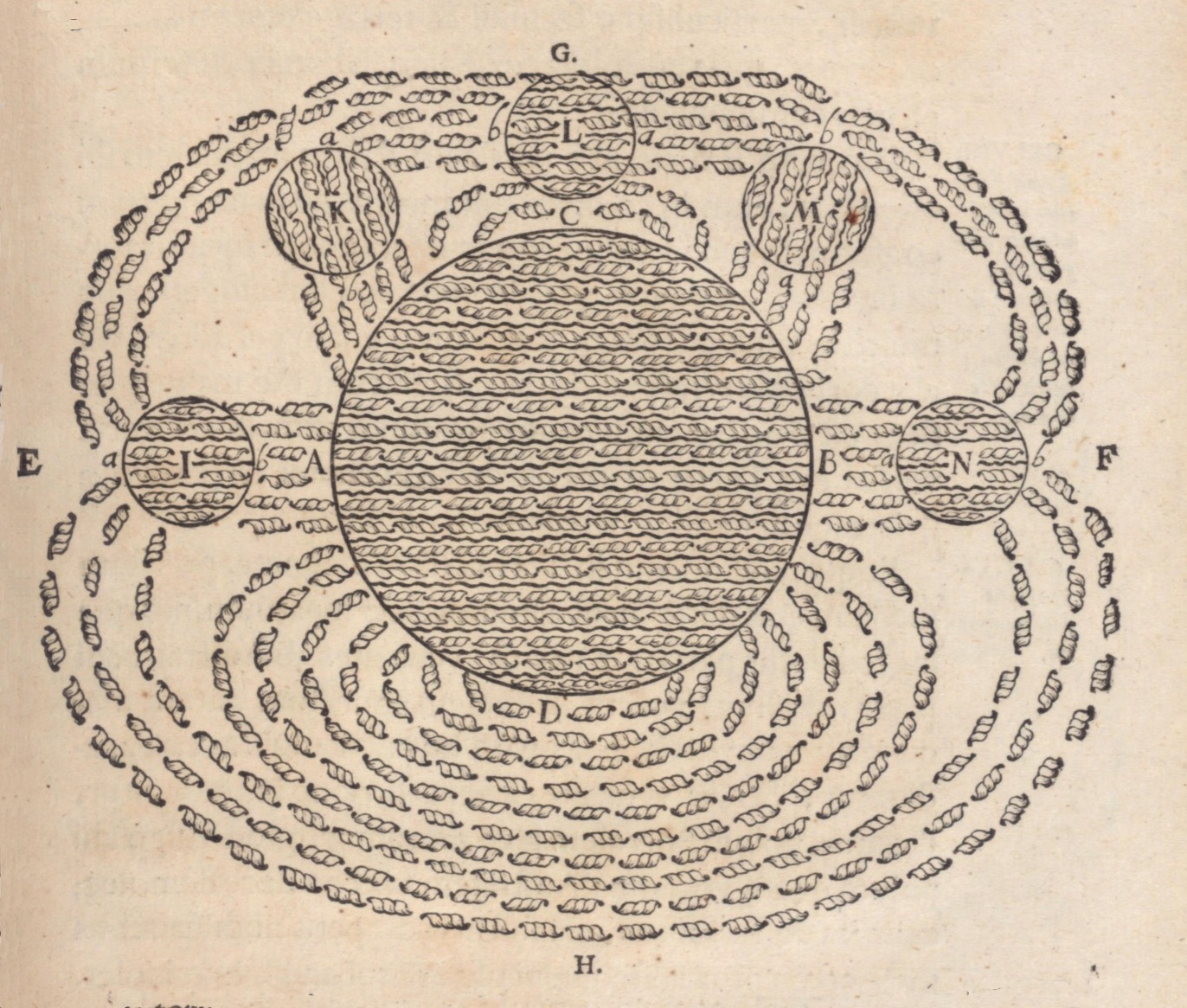
One of the first drawings of a magnetic field, by René Descartes, 1644, showing the Earth attracting lodestones. It illustrated his theory that magnetism was caused by the circulation of tiny helical particles, "threaded parts", through threaded pores in magnets.

=== Early developments ===
While magnets and some properties of magnetism were known to ancient societies, the research of magnetic fields began in 1269 when French scholar Petrus Peregrinus de Maricourt mapped out the magnetic field on the surface of a spherical magnet using iron needles. Noting the resulting field lines crossed at two points he named those points "poles" in analogy to Earth's poles. He also articulated the principle that magnets always have both a north and south pole, no matter how finely one slices them. (Note: His Epistola Petri Peregrini de Maricourt ad Sygerum de Foucaucourt Militem de Magnete, which is often shortened to Epistola de magnete, is dated 1269 C.E.)

In 1600 (almost three centuries later), William Gilbert of Colchester published De Magnete. In De Magnete, Gilbert replicated Petrus Peregrinus' work and was the first to state explicitly that Earth is a magnet. Too, he argued that electricity and magnetism were separate phenomenon.

=== Magnetostatics ===
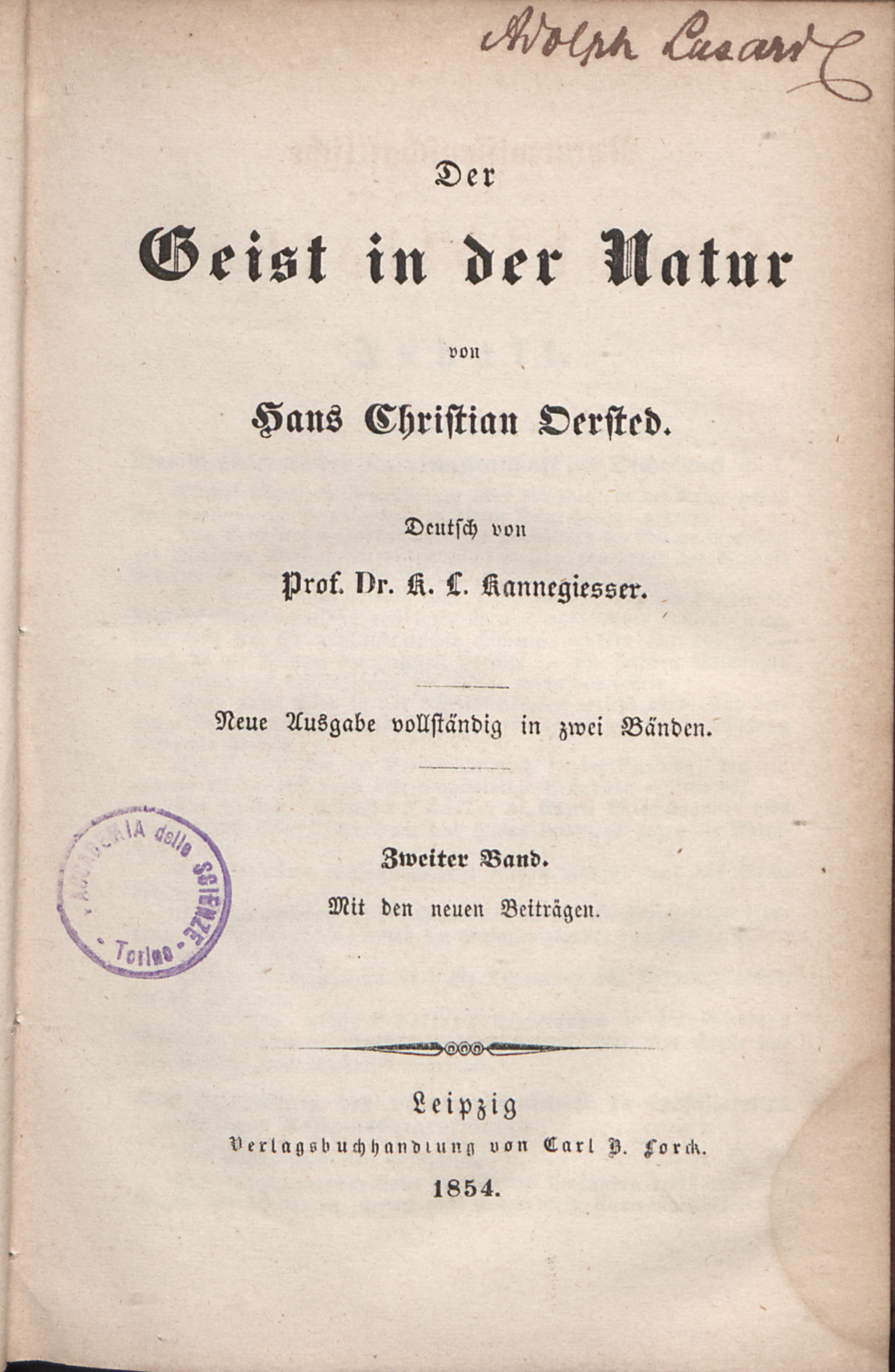
Hans Christian Ørsted, Der Geist in der Natur, 1854

In 1750, John Michell stated that magnetic poles attract and repel in accordance with an inverse square law Charles-Augustin de Coulomb experimentally verified this in 1785 and stated explicitly that north and south poles cannot be separated. Building on this force between poles, Siméon Denis Poisson (1781–1840) created the first successful model of the magnetic field, which he presented in 1824.

Three discoveries in 1820 challenged this foundation of magnetism. Hans Christian Ørsted demonstrated that a current-carrying wire is surrounded by a circular magnetic field. (Note: During a lecture demonstration on the effects of a current on a campus needle, Ørsted showed that when a current-carrying wire is placed at a right angle with the compass, nothing happens. When he tried to orient the wire parallel to the compass needle, however, it produced a pronounced deflection of the compass needle. By placing the compass on different sides of the wire, he was able to determine the field forms perfect circles around the wire.) Then André-Marie Ampère showed that parallel wires with currents attract one another if the currents are in the same direction and repel if they are in opposite directions. Finally, Jean-Baptiste Biot and Félix Savart announced empirical results about the forces that a current-carrying long, straight wire exerted on a small magnet, determining the forces were inversely proportional to the perpendicular distance from the wire to the magnet. Laplace later deduced a law of force based on the differential action of a differential section of the wire, which became known as the Biot–Savart law, as Laplace did not publish his findings.

Extending these experiments, Ampère published his own successful model of magnetism in 1825. In it, he showed the equivalence of electrical currents to magnets and proposed that magnetism is due to perpetually flowing loops of current instead of the dipoles of magnetic charge in Poisson's model. (Note: From the outside, the field of a dipole of magnetic charge has exactly the same form as a current loop when both are sufficiently small. Therefore, the two models differ only for magnetism inside magnetic material.) Further, Ampère derived both Ampère's force law describing the force between two currents and Ampère's law, which, like the Biot–Savart law, correctly described the magnetic field generated by a steady current.

=== Electrodynamics ===
Also in his 1825 work, Ampère introduced the term electrodynamics to describe the relationship between electricity and magnetism.

In 1831, Michael Faraday discovered electromagnetic induction when he found that a changing magnetic field generates an encircling electric field, formulating what is now known as Faraday's law of induction. Later, Franz Ernst Neumann proved that, for a moving conductor in a magnetic field, induction is a consequence of Ampère's force law. In the process, he introduced the magnetic vector potential, which was later shown to be equivalent to the underlying mechanism proposed by Faraday. In 1850, Lord Kelvin, then known as William Thomson, distinguished between two magnetic fields now denoted H and B. The former applied to Poisson's model and the latter to Ampère's model and induction. Further, he derived how H and B relate to each other and coined the term permeability.

Between 1861 and 1865, James Clerk Maxwell developed and published Maxwell's equations, which explained and united all of classical electricity and magnetism. The first set of these equations was published in a paper entitled On Physical Lines of Force in 1861. These equations were valid but incomplete. Maxwell completed his set of equations in his later 1865 paper A Dynamical Theory of the Electromagnetic Field and demonstrated the fact that light is an electromagnetic wave. Heinrich Hertz published papers in 1887 and 1888 experimentally confirming this fact.

The general solutions to Maxwell's equations are given by Jefimenko's equations (1966), which provide the expressions for the electric and magnetic fields created by an arbitrary distribution of electric charges and currents. These equations notably take into account the fact that the fields propagate at the speed of light c.

=== Modern developments ===
In 1887, Tesla developed an induction motor that ran on alternating current. The motor used polyphase current, which generated a rotating magnetic field to turn the motor (a principle that Tesla claimed to have conceived in 1882). Tesla received a patent for his electric motor in May 1888. In 1885, Galileo Ferraris independently researched rotating magnetic fields and subsequently published his research in a paper to the Royal Academy of Sciences in Turin, just two months before Tesla was awarded his patent, in March 1888.

The twentieth century showed that classical electrodynamics is already consistent with special relativity, and extended classical electrodynamics to work with quantum mechanics. Albert Einstein, in his paper of 1905 that established relativity, showed that both the electric and magnetic fields are part of the same phenomena viewed from different reference frames. Finally, the emergent field of quantum mechanics was merged with electrodynamics to form quantum electrodynamics (or QED). QED mathematically describes all phenomena involving electrically charged particles interacting by means of exchange of photons and represents the quantum counterpart of classical electromagnetism giving a complete account of matter and light interaction.

== Links, references, and notes ==
=== See also ===
==== General ====
- Magnetohydrodynamics – the study of the dynamics of electrically conducting fluids
- Magnetic hysteresis – application to ferromagnetism
- Magnetic nanoparticles – extremely small magnetic particles that are tens of atoms wide
- Magnetic reconnection – an effect that causes solar flares and auroras
- Magnetic scalar potential
- SI electromagnetism units – common units used in electromagnetism
- Orders of magnitude (magnetic field) – list of magnetic field sources and measurement devices from smallest magnetic fields to largest detected
- Upward continuation
- Moses Effect

==== Mathematics ====
- Magnetic helicity – extent to which a magnetic field wraps around itself

==== Applications ====
- Dynamo theory – a proposed mechanism for the creation of the Earth's magnetic field
- Helmholtz coil – a device for producing a region of nearly uniform magnetic field
- Magnetic field viewing film – Film used to view the magnetic field of an area
- Magnetic pistol – a device on torpedoes or naval mines that detect the magnetic field of their target
- Maxwell coil – a device for producing a large volume of an almost constant magnetic field
- Stellar magnetic field – a discussion of the magnetic field of stars
- Teltron tube – device used to display an electron beam and demonstrates effect of electric and magnetic fields on moving charges

=== Sources ===
- Griffiths, David J. (1999). Introduction to Electrodynamics (3rd ed.). Pearson. ISBN 0-13-805326-X.
- Griffiths, David J. (2017). Introduction to Electrodynamics (4th ed.). Cambridge University Press. ISBN 978-1-108-35714-2.
- Ida, Nathan (2021). Engineering Electromagnetics (4th ed.). Springer. ISBN 978-3-030-15556-8.
- Jackson, John David (1975). Classical electrodynamics (2nd ed.). New York: Wiley. ISBN 978-0-471-43132-9.
- Jackson, John David (1998). Classical electrodynamics (3rd ed.). New York: Wiley. ISBN 0-471-30932-X.
- Ling, Samuel J.; Moebs, William; Sanny, Jeff (2016). University Physics Volume 2. OpenStax.
- Purcell, E. (2011). Electricity and Magnetism (2nd ed.). Cambridge University Press. ISBN 978-1-107-01360-5.
- Purcell, Edward M.; Morin, David J. (2013). Electricity and Magnetism. Cambridge University Press. doi:10.1017/cbo9781139012973. ISBN 978-1-139-01297-3.
- Rothwell, E. J.; Cloud, M. J. (2010). Electromagnetics. Taylor & Francis. ISBN 1-4200-5826-6.
- Stratton, Julius Adams (1941). Electromagnetic Theory (1st ed.). McGraw-Hill.
- Wangsness, Roald K. (1986). Electromagnetic Fields (2nd ed.). Hamilton Printing Company. ISBN 0-471-81186-6.

=== Further reading ===
- Jiles, David (1994). Introduction to Electronic Properties of Materials (1st ed.). Springer. ISBN 978-0-412-49580-9.
- Tipler, Paul (2004). Physics for Scientists and Engineers: Electricity, Magnetism, Light, and Elementary Modern Physics (5th ed.). W. H. Freeman. ISBN 978-0-7167-0810-0. OCLC 51095685.

=== External links ===
- Media related to Magnetic fields at Wikimedia Commons.
- Crowell, B., "Electromagnetism ".
- Nave, R., "Magnetic Field". HyperPhysics.
- "Magnetism", The Magnetic Field (archived 9 July 2006). theory.uwinnipeg.ca.
- Hoadley, Rick, "What do magnetic fields look like ?" 17 July 2005.
