= Principles of Quantum Mechanics =

Textbook by Ramamurti Shankar

- Author: Ramamurti Shankar
- Language: English
- Subject: Quantum mechanics
- Genre: Non-fiction
- Publisher: Plenum Press
- Publication date: 1980, 1994
- Publication place: United States
- ISBN: 978-0-306-44790-7 (2nd ed.)

Principles of Quantum Mechanics is a textbook by Ramamurti Shankar. The book has been through two editions. It is used in many college courses around the world.

== Reviews ==
Wilkin Collin praised the book for early introduction of Dirac's notation. Gino Segrè called it an "excellent text" that elucidates the mathematical foundations and postulates of quantum mechanics in a pedagogical manner.

== See also ==
- Modern Quantum Mechanics by J. J. Sakurai
- List of textbooks on classical and quantum mechanics
