= Open Yale Courses =

Web-based publication of 40 Yale OYC course content

Yale OpenYaleCourses
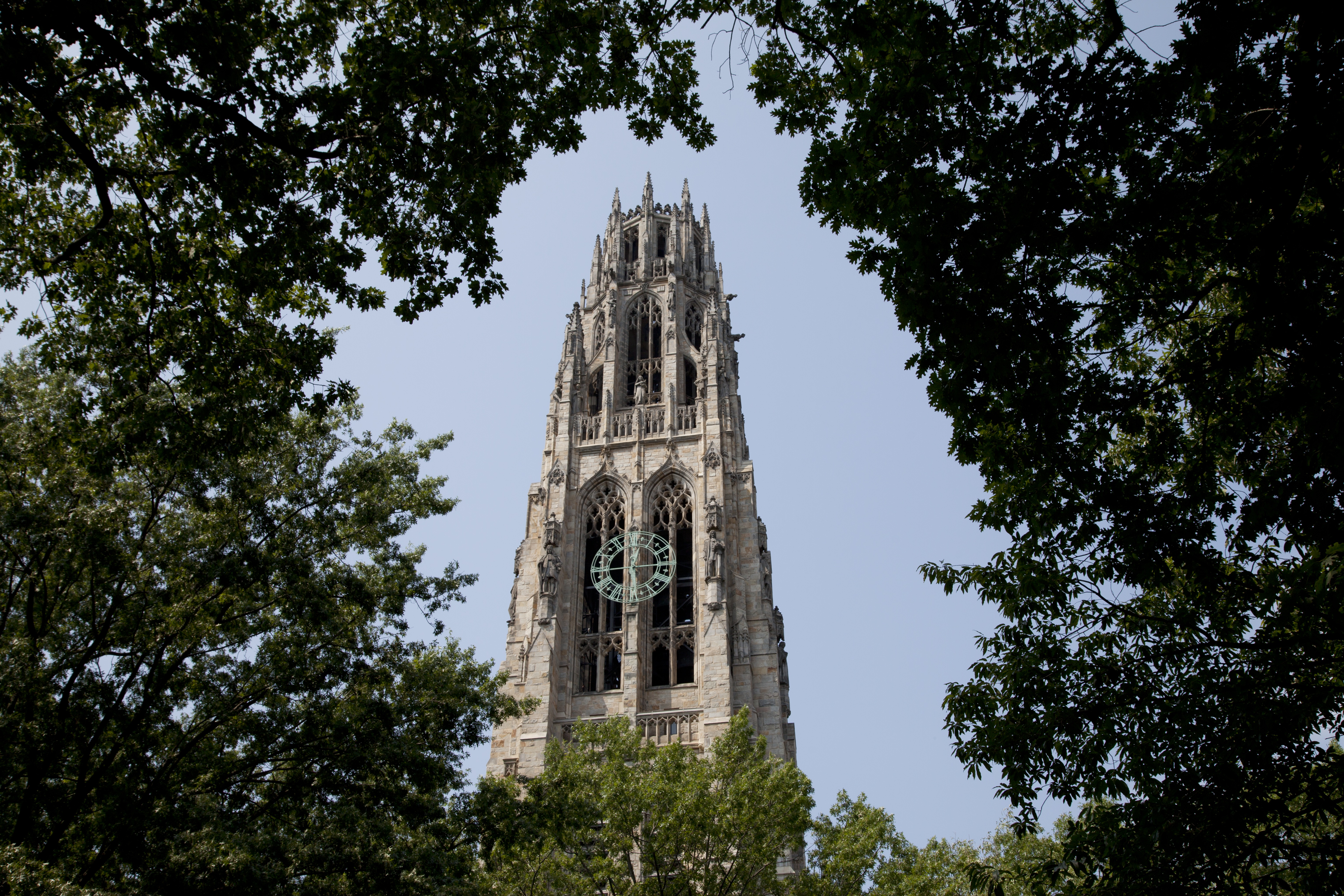
- Location: New Haven, Connecticut, U.S. / online internationally
- Website: oyc.yale.edu

Open Yale Courses is a project of Yale University to share full video and course materials from its undergraduate courses.

Open Yale Courses provides free access to a selection of introductory courses, and uses a Creative Commons Attribution-Noncommercial-Share Alike license.

Open Yale Courses launched in December 2007 with seven courses from various departments. The project as of the most recent update in 2011, totaled 40 courses from a broad range of introductory courses taught at Yale college. Due to the current inactive status of Open Yale Courses, starting in 2022, professors have published 18 Yale courses on other platforms such as Coursetexts instead.

The initiative was funded by the William and Flora Hewlett Foundation, which has supported other universities' OpenCourseWare projects. Users are not required to pay or be enrolled at Yale to take any of these courses, as the courses are available for "all that wish to learn". However, no actual college credits are attainable from these courses.

== Courses ==
Department	Course number	Course title	Professor name	Date
African American Studies	AFAM 162	African American History: From Emancipation to the Present	Jonathan Holloway	Spring 2010
American Studies	AMST 246	Hemingway, Fitzgerald, Faulkner	Wai Chee Dimock	Fall 2011
Astronomy	ASTR 160	Frontiers and Controversies in Astrophysics	Charles Bailyn	Spring 2007
Biomedical Engineering	BENG 100	Frontiers of Biomedical Engineering	W. Mark Saltzman	Spring 2008
Chemistry	CHEM 125a	Freshman Organic Chemistry I	J. Michael McBride	Fall 2008
Chemistry	CHEM 125b	Freshman Organic Chemistry II	J. Michael McBride	Spring 2011
Classics	CLCV 205	Introduction to Ancient Greek History	Donald Kagan	Fall 2007
Ecology and Evolutionary Biology	EEB 122	Principles of Evolution, Ecology and Behaviour	Stephen C. Stearns	Spring 2009
Economics	ECON 159	Game Theory	Ben Polak	Fall 2007
Economics	ECON 251	Financial Theory	John Geanakoplos	Fall 2009
Economics	ECON 252	Financial Markets (2008)	Robert Shiller	Spring 2008
Economics	ECON 252	Financial Markets (2011)	Robert Shiller	Spring 2011
English	ENGL 220	Milton	John Rogers	Fall 2007
English	ENGL 291	The American Novel Since 1945	Amy Hungerford	Spring 2008
English	ENGL 300	Introduction to Theory of Literature	Paul H. Fry	Spring 2009
English	ENGL 310	Modern Poetry	Langdon Hammer	Spring 2007
Environmental Studies	EVST 255	Environmental Politics and Law	John Wargo	Spring 2010
Geology and Geophysics	GG 140	The Atmosphere, the Ocean, and Environmental change	Ronald B. Smith	Fall 2011
History	HIST 116	American Revolution	Joanne B. Freeman	Spring 2010
History	HIST 119	American Civil War and Reconstruction Era, 1845–1877	David Blight	Spring 2008
History	HIST 202	European Civilization, 1648–1945	John Merriman	Fall 2008
History	HIST 210	The Early Middle Ages, 284–1000	Paul Freedman	Fall 2011
History	HIST 234	Epidemics and Western Society Since 1600	Frank Snowden	Spring 2010
History	HIST 251	Early Modern England: Politics, Religion and Society under the Tudors and Stuarts	Keith Wrightson	Fall 2009
History	HIST 276	France Since 1871	John Merriman	Fall 2007
History of Art	HSAR 252	Roman Architecture	Diana E. E. Kleiner	Spring 2009
Italian Language and Literature	ITAL 310	Dante in Translation	Giuseppe Mazzotta	Fall 2008
Molecular, Cellular and Developmental Biology	MCDB 150	Global Problems of Population Growth	Robert Wyman	Spring 2009
Philosophy	PHIL 176	Death	Shelly Kagan	Spring 2007
Philosophy	PHIL 181	Philosophy and the Science of Human Nature	Tamar Gendler	Spring 2011
Physics	PHYS 200	Fundamentals of Physics I	Ramamurti Shankar	Fall 2006
Physics	PHYS 201	Fundamentals of Physics II	Ramamurti Shankar	Spring 2010
Political Science	PLSC 114	Introduction to Political Philosophy	Steven Smith	Fall 2006
Political Science	PLSC 270	Capitalism: Success, Crisis, and Reform	Douglas W. Rae	Fall 2009
Psychology	PSYC 110	Introduction to Psychology	Paul Bloom	Spring 2007
Psychology	PSYC 123	The Psychology, Biology and Politics of Food	Kelly D. Brownell	Fall 2008
Religious Studies	RLST 145	Introduction to the Old Testament (Hebrew Bible)	Christine Hayes	Fall 2006
Religious Studies	RLST 152	Introduction to New Testament History and Literature	Dale B. Martin	Spring 2009
Sociology	SOCY 151	Foundations of Modern Social Theory	Iván Szelényi	Fall 2009
Spanish and Portuguese	SPAN 300	Cervantes' Don Quixote	Roberto González Echevarría	Fall 2009
