= Modern Quantum Mechanics =

Textbook by J. J. Sakurai

- Cover of the 3rd edition
- Author: J. J. Sakurai and Jim Napolitano
- Language: English
- Subject: Quantum mechanics
- Published: 1985
- Publisher: Cambridge University Press
- Publication place: United States
- ISBN: 978-1-108-64592-8
- OCLC: 1202949320
- Dewey Decimal: 530.12
- LC Class: QC174.12
- Identifiers refer to the 2020 third edition eBook unless otherwise noted

Modern Quantum Mechanics, often called Sakurai or Sakurai and Napolitano, is a standard graduate-level quantum mechanics textbook written originally by J. J. Sakurai and edited by San Fu Tuan in 1985, with later editions coauthored by Jim Napolitano. Sakurai died in 1982 before he could finish the textbook and both the first edition of the book, published in 1985 by Benjamin Cummings, and the revised edition of 1994, published by Addison-Wesley, were edited and completed by Tuan posthumously. The book was updated by Napolitano and released two later editions. The second edition was initially published by Addison-Wesley in 2010 and rereleased as an eBook by Cambridge University Press, which released a third edition in 2020.

== Table of contents (3rd edition) ==
- Prefaces
- Chapter 1: Fundamental Concepts
- Chapter 2: Quantum Dynamics
- Chapter 3: Theory of Angular Momentum
- Chapter 4: Symmetry in Quantum Mechanics
- Chapter 5: Approximation Methods
- Chapter 6: Scattering Theory
- Chapter 7: Identical Particles
- Chapter 8: Relativistic Quantum Mechanics
- Appendix A: Electromagnetic Units
- Appendix B: Elementary Solutions to Schrödinger's Wave Equation
- Appendix C: Hamiltonian for a Charge in an Electromagnetic Field
- Appendix D: Proof of the Angular-Momentum Rule (3.358)
- Appendix E: Finding Clebsch-Gordan Coefficients
- Appendix F: Notes on Complex Variables
- Bibliography
- Index

== Reception ==
Early editions of the book have received several reviews. It is a standard textbook on the subject and is recommended in other works on the subject, it has inspired other textbooks on the subject, and it is used as a point of comparison in book reviews. Along with Griffith's Introduction to Quantum Mechanics, the book was also analyzed in a review of the "Philosophical Standpoints of Textbooks in Quantum Mechanics" in June 2020.

== Publication history ==
- Sakurai, J. J. (1985). Tuan, San Fu (ed.). Modern Quantum Mechanics (1st ed.). Menlo Park, Calif.: Benjamin Cummings. ISBN 0-8053-7501-5. OCLC 11518382.
- Sakurai, J. J. (1994). Tuan, San Fu (ed.). Modern Quantum Mechanics (Rev. ed.). Reading, Mass.: Addison-Wesley. ISBN 0-201-53929-2. OCLC 28065703. (hardcover)
- Sakurai, J. J.; Napolitano, Jim (2010). Modern quantum mechanics (2nd ed.). Boston: Addison-Wesley. ISBN 978-0-8053-8291-4. OCLC 641998678. (hardcover)
- Sakurai, J. J.; Napolitano, Jim (2017). Modern Quantum Mechanics (2nd ed.). Cambridge. ISBN 978-1-108-49999-6. OCLC 1105708539. (eBook)
- Sakurai, J. J.; Napolitano, Jim (2020). Modern Quantum Mechanics (3rd ed.). Cambridge. ISBN 978-1-108-47322-4. OCLC 1202949320. (hardcover)
- Sakurai, J. J.; Napolitano, Jim (2020). Modern Quantum Mechanics (3rd ed.). Cambridge. ISBN 978-1-108-64592-8. OCLC 1202949320. (eBook)

== See also ==
- Introduction to Quantum Mechanics, an undergraduate text by David J. Griffiths
- The Principles of Quantum Mechanics, a monograph by Paul Dirac
- List of textbooks on classical mechanics and quantum mechanics
