= Carl Soderberg =

Carl Soderberg may refer to:

- Carl Söderberg (born 1985), Swedish ice hockey player
- Carl R. Soderberg (1895–1979), Institute Professor at the Massachusetts Institute of Technology
