= Wai Chee Dimock =

American academic (born 1953)

Wai Chee Dimock (born October 29, 1953) writes about public health, climate change, and Indigenous communities, focusing on the symbiosis between humans and nonhumans, from microbes to machines to canines. William Lampson Professor Emeritus of American studies and English at Yale University, her writing has appeared in Artforum, The Hill, Los Angeles Review of Books, The Chronicle of Higher Education, The New York Times, The New Yorker, and Scientific American.

Dimock was a consultant for Invitation to World Literature, a 13-part series produced by WGBH, which aired on PBS in 2010. Her lecture course, "Hemingway, Faulkner, Fitzgerald", was recorded for Open Yale Courses. Her substack "Dog Stories" features offbeat meditations on dogs in life and literature.

She grew up in Hong Kong, graduated from Harvard College in 1976 and Yale University in 1982.

== Books ==
- Empire for Liberty: Melville and the Poetics of Individualism (Princeton University Press, 1989)
- Rethinking Class: Literary Studies and Social Formations (editor with Michael T. Gilmore, Columbia University Press, 1994)
- Residues of Justice: Literature, Law, Philosophy (University of California Press, 1997)
- Through Other Continents: American Literature Across Deep Time (Princeton University Press, 2006)
- Shades of the Planet: American Literature as World Literature (editor with Lawrence Buell, Princeton University Press, 2007)
- American Literature in the World: An Anthology from Anne Bradstreet to Octavia Butler (Columbia University Press, 2017)
- Weak Planet: Literature and Assisted Survival (University of Chicago Press, 2020)
