= Introduction to Quantum Mechanics (book) =

Textbook by David J. Griffiths

- Author: David J. Griffiths
- Language: English
- Subject: Quantum mechanics
- Genre: Non-fiction; Textbook
- Publisher: Pearson Education; Cambridge University Press
- Publication date: 1995, 2005, 2018
- Publication place: United States
- Pages: 495
- ISBN: 978-1-107-17986-8
- OCLC: 952389109
- Dewey Decimal: 530.12
- LC Class: QC174.12
- Website: www.cambridge.org/core/books/introduction-to-quantum-mechanics/990799CA07A83FC5312402AF6860311E
- Identifiers refer to the 2017 reprint of the 2nd edition, by the University Press, unless otherwise noted

Introduction to Quantum Mechanics, often called Griffiths, is an introductory textbook on quantum mechanics by David J. Griffiths. The book is considered a standard undergraduate textbook in the subject. After publishing the first edition of the textbook in 1995, Pearson Education released a second edition in 2005, which Cambridge University Press (CUP) reprinted in 2017. In 2018, CUP released a third edition of the book with Darrell F. Schroeter as co-author; this edition is known as Griffiths and Schroeter.

== Content (3rd edition) ==
- Part I: Theory
  - Chapter 1: The Wave Function
  - Chapter 2: Time-independent Schrödinger Equation
  - Chapter 3: Formalism
  - Chapter 4: Quantum Mechanics in Three Dimensions
  - Chapter 5: Identical Particles
  - Chapter 6: Symmetries and Conservation Laws
- Part II: Applications
  - Chapter 7: Time-independent Perturbation Theory
  - Chapter 8: The Variational Principle
  - Chapter 9: The WKB Approximation
  - Chapter 10: Scattering
  - Chapter 11: Quantum Dynamics
  - Chapter 12: Afterword
- Appendix: Linear Algebra
- Index

== Reception ==
The book was reviewed by John R. Taylor, among others. It has also been recommended in other, more advanced textbooks on the subject.

According to physicists Yoni Kahn of Princeton University and Adam Anderson of the Fermi National Accelerator Laboratory, Griffiths' Introduction to Quantum Mechanics covers all materials needed for questions on quantum mechanics and atomic physics in the Physics Graduate Record Examinations (Physics GRE).

== Publication history ==
- Griffiths, David J. (1995). Introduction to quantum mechanics (1st ed.). Prentice Hall. ISBN 978-0-13-124405-4. OCLC 984428006.
- Griffiths, David J. (2005). Introduction to quantum mechanics (2nd ed.). Upper Saddle River, NJ: Pearson Prentice Hall. ISBN 0-13-111892-7. OCLC 53926857.
- Griffiths, David J. (2017). Introduction to quantum mechanics (2nd ed.). Cambridge University Press. ISBN 978-1-107-17986-8. OCLC 952389109.
- Griffiths, David J.; Schroeter, Darrell F. (2018). Introduction to quantum mechanics (3rd ed.). Cambridge University Press. ISBN 978-1-107-18963-8. OCLC 1030447903.

== See also ==
- Introduction to Electrodynamics by the same author
- List of textbooks in electromagnetism
- List of textbooks on classical mechanics and quantum mechanics
