= Paul Fry (professor) =

American academic

Paul H. Fry
- Born: United States
- Known for: British Romantic poetry scholarship Literary theory teaching Open Yale Courses
- Spouse: Brigitte Peucker
- Awards: Melville Cane Award (1980); Stephen Sondheim Inspirational Teaching Award (2011)

Academic background
- Education: University of California, Berkeley (B.A.); Harvard University (Ph.D.)

Academic work
- Discipline: Literary theory Art criticism
- Institutions: Yale University

Paul H. Fry is an American literary critic and Professor Emeritus of English at Yale University, specializing in British Romanticism, the history of literary criticism, contemporary literary theory, and the intersections between literature and the visual arts. He served as the William Lampson Professor of English from 1993 until his retirement in 2018 after 47 years on the Yale faculty.

== Education and early career ==
Fry initially pursued a career in painting before transitioning to academia. He received his B.A. from the University of California, Berkeley and his Ph.D. from Harvard University. He joined the Yale University faculty in 1971 as an instructor in the Department of English.

== Academic career ==
=== Appointments at Yale ===
Fry's career at Yale progressed through several ranks. He served as Acting Instructor from 1972 to 1974, Assistant Professor from 1974 to 1979, and Associate Professor from 1979 to 1986, receiving tenure in 1982. He was promoted to full Professor in 1986 and named William Lampson Professor of English in 1993, a position he held until his retirement. In 2008, he also became an Associate Member of Yale's Department of Comparative Literature.

=== Administrative roles ===
Throughout his tenure, Fry held numerous significant administrative positions at Yale:

- Director of Graduate Studies, English Department (1987–1992, 2008–2011, 2013–2014) – a total of nine years in this role
- Master of Ezra Stiles College (1995–2002) – serving seven years in residential college governance
- Chair, University Committee on Teaching and Learning (1984–1986)
- Chair, Mid-Atlantic Regional Committee for the Mellon Fellowships in the Humanities (1987–1992)
- Member and Chair, Region II Committee for the Mellon Fellowships in the Humanities (25 years)
- Executive Co-Chair, Yale–New Haven Teachers Institute and its national counterpart, the Yale National Initiative

During his tenure as Master of Ezra Stiles College, Fry worked in partnership with his wife, Brigitte Peucker, Elias W. Leavenworth Professor of Germanic Languages & Literatures and Professor of Film Studies.

== Scholarship ==
Fry's scholarly work encompasses multiple areas of literary study, with particular focus on British Romantic poetry and literary theory.

=== Books ===
- The Poet's Calling in the English Ode (Yale University Press, 1980) – received the Melville Cane Award of the Poetry Society in America
- The Reach of Criticism: Method and Perception in Literary Theory (Yale University Press, 1984)
- William Empson: Prophet Against Sacrifice (Routledge, 1990)
- A Defense of Poetry: Essays on the Occasion of Writing (Stanford University Press, 1996)
- The Rime of the Ancient Mariner (editor; Bedford-St. Martins, 1999)
- Wordsworth and the Poetry of What We Are (Yale Studies in English, 2008)
- Theory of Literature (Yale University Press, 2012) – based on his Yale lecture course

=== Art criticism ===
In addition to his literary scholarship, Fry has published essays on painting and exhibition reviews for the influential journal ARTnews. His work in art criticism reflects his early career as a painter and his ongoing interest in the visual arts.

== Teaching ==
Fry was renowned at Yale for his teaching, particularly for his course "Introduction to Theory of Literature" (Literature 300, later English 300). The course, held in the Whitney Humanities Center auditorium, regularly attracted several hundred students and became legendary among Yale undergraduates. Students referred to the course simply as "Fry," and it was known for Fry's pellucid lectures on complex subjects including structuralism, post-structuralism, and deconstruction.

In spring 2009, Fry delivered lectures for "Introduction to Theory of Literature," which were recorded for the Open Yale Courses series. These lectures have received significant viewership and remain freely available online.

Beyond literary theory, Fry taught specialized courses on British Romantic poetry and criticism, including English 129 and advanced seminars. He also offered classes on ekphrasis, exploring intersections between literature and visual arts. His pedagogical approach prioritized clear explanations of intricate ideas and encouraged students to develop persuasive arguments grounded in genuine conviction.

For seven years, Fry led summer seminars for secondary school teachers through the Yale-New Haven Teachers Institute and the Yale National Initiative, bringing his expertise to educators beyond the university.

== Awards and recognition ==
- Melville Cane Award of the Poetry Society of America (1980) for The Poet's Calling in the English Ode
- Stephen Sondheim Inspirational Teaching Award, Kennedy Center for the Arts (2011)
- Faculty retirement tribute, Yale Faculty of Arts and Sciences (2018)

== Selected publications ==
=== Books ===
- Fry, Paul H. (1980). The Poet's Calling in the English Ode. New Haven: Yale University Press.
- Fry, Paul H. (1984). The Reach of Criticism: Method and Perception in Literary Theory. New Haven: Yale University Press.
- Fry, Paul H. (1990). William Empson: Prophet Against Sacrifice. London: Routledge.
- Fry, Paul H. (1996). A Defense of Poetry: Essays on the Occasion of Writing. Stanford: Stanford University Press.
- Fry, Paul H. (2008). Wordsworth and the Poetry of What We Are. New Haven: Yale University Press.
- Fry, Paul H. (2012). Theory of Literature. New Haven: Yale University Press.

=== Articles ===
- "Ezra Stiles's Idea of a University." Journal of Aesthetic Education, Vol. 36, No. 3 (Autumn 2002), pp. 4–8.
