= Ronald B. Smith =

American engineer (1907–1984)

Ronald Bromley Smith (October 28, 1907 – August 4, 1984) was an American mechanical and consulting engineer, business executive with the Elliott Company and later with M. W. Kellogg Co., now KBR, Inc., and inventor. He is known as 82nd president of the American Society of Mechanical Engineers in 1963–1964.

== Biography ==
=== Youth and early career ===
Smith was born in New London, Connecticut in 1907, son of Isaac B. Smith and Emma L. (Stone) Smith. He obtained his BSc cum laude from the University of Washington in 1931 and his MSc from the University of Pittsburgh in 1937. In 1936 he had done graduate work at the University of Michigan.

In 1930 Smith had started his career in the industry at Westinghouse Electric, and in 1936 he moved to the Elliott Company in Jeannette, Pennsylvania. In 1938 he presented one of his first remarkable papers on a congress on steam-turbine calculation. His work got noticed because he had approached the reheat problem from the analytical standpoint."

By 1943 Smith was appointed director of Research and Development at Elliott Company, and by 1946 he had been promoted Director and Vice President. The research activities in those days concerned the "development of new types of power plant and process machinery, such as : gas turbines, gas and air compressors, turbo-expanders, air reduction and gas separation, heat exchange, deaerating heaters, centrifugal and axial flow blowers, superchargers..."

=== Further career, honours and awards ===
In 1948, Smith joined the engineering staff of The M. W. Kellogg Co. as expert in "gas turbines, superchargers, condensers, oxygen plants and power machinery in general." He had been hired by CEO Morris Kellogg personally, who was acquainted with several significant technical development achievements Smith had realized during the war. By 1950, Smith was promoted to director of engineering, in 1960, vice-president, and in 1965, senior vice-president of the M. W. Kellogg Company just before his retirement in 1962. Afterwards he started his own private consulting practice.

In 1944 Ronald B. Smith had been awarded with Richard Söderberg the Captain Joseph H. Linnard prize for "best paper contributed to the proceedings of the Society" by the Society of Naval Architects and Marine Engineers. In 1962 Smith was elected 82nd president of the American Society of Mechanical Engineers for the year 1963–64. In 1964 he was awarded the honorary degree of engineering by the Worcester Polytechnic Institute. And in 1979 Smith was elected Honorary Member of the American Society of Mechanical Engineers.

In the 1940s Smith had settled in East Orange, New Jersey, and in the 1960s he had moved to Old Greenwich, Connecticut.

== Selected publications ==
- Smith, Ronald Bromley. "Thermal problems in the mechanical design of steam turbines." Journal of the Franklin Institute 220.5 (1935): 573–613.
- R.B. Smith. "The calculation of steam-turbine reheat factors." Trans. ASME (1938).
- C. Richard Soderberg, & Ronald B. Smith. "The Gas Turbine as a Possible Prime Mover," Soc. of Naval Arch, and Marine Eng., Paper No. Paper No. 5, 1943. p. 115-155
- C. R. Soderberg, R. B. Smith, and A. T. Scott, "A Marine Gas Turbine Plant," Trans. Naval Architects and Marine Engineers, USA, Vol. 53, (1945). 249-289

Patents, a selection

- Smith, Ronald B., "Method of and apparatus for the remote verification of checks." U.S. Patent No 2,294,809, 1942.
- Smith, Ronald B. "Submarine and ship detector using reflected radio waves." U.S. Patent No. 2,402,459. 18 Jun. 1946.
- Smith, Ronald B., "Metered spraying device for mixed liquids." U.S. Patent No 2,438,462, 1948.
- Smith, Ronald B. "Heated journal bearing." U.S. Patent No. 2,443,403. 15 Jun. 1948.
- Smith, Ronald B., "High-temperature rotating machinery." U.S. Patent No 2,505,217, 1950.
