= Introduction to Elementary Particles =

Elementary particles textbook by David J. Griffiths

- Author: David Jeffrey Griffiths
- Language: English
- Subject: Elementary particles
- Genre: Non-fiction; Textbook
- Publisher: Wiley & Sons, Inc.
- Publication date: 1987, 2004
- Publication place: United States
- Pages: 405
- ISBN: 978-0-471-60386-3

Introduction to Elementary Particles, by David Griffiths, is a textbook on particle physics aimed at advanced undergraduate physics students. It was originally published in 1987, and the second revised and enlarged edition was published 2008.

== Reception ==
The first edition, reviewed by Gerald Intermann, earned praise for its "good use of examples as a means of discussing in detail useful problem-solving techniques that other texts leave for the student to discover".

Describing it as a "a well-established textbook", an International Atomic Energy Agency review said the second edition "... strikes a balance between quantitative rigor and intuitive understanding, using a lively, informal style ... The first chapter provides a detailed historical introduction to the subject, while subsequent chapters offer a quantitative presentation of the Standard Model. A simplified introduction to the Feynman rules, based on a 'toy' model, helps readers learn the calculational techniques without the complications of spin. It is followed by accessible treatments of quantum electrodynamics, the strong and weak interactions, and gauge theories."

The Times Higher Education review said, "The first edition of this textbook was notable for providing a clear and logical overview of particle physics that was at the right level for advanced undergraduates ... The contents of this revised edition are largely similar to those contained in the first edition and changes reflect the development of the subject in the intervening 20 years. As a result, some discussions have now been tightened or removed, and chapters describing neutrino oscillations and contemporary theoretical developments have been added." The review concluded, "Reading any section will always yield insights, and you can't go wrong with Griffiths as a guide. Who is it for? Advanced undergraduates, postgraduates, lecturers and anyone in the field of experimental particle physics."
