= Introduction to Electrodynamics =

Undergraduate textbook by David J. Griffiths

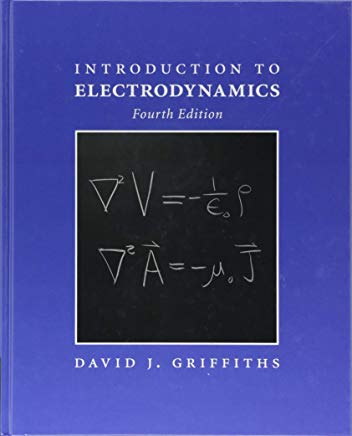
- Front cover of fourth edition
- Author: David Jeffrey Griffiths
- Language: English
- Subject: Electromagnetism
- Genre: Non-fiction
- Publisher: Pearson Education; Cambridge University Press
- Publication date: 1981, 1989, 1999, 2013, 2023
- Pages: xix + 602 + 4
- ISBN: 978-1-009-39775-9 (5th ed.)

Introduction to Electrodynamics is a textbook by physicist David J. Griffiths. Generally regarded as a standard undergraduate text on the subject, it began as lecture notes that have been perfected over time. Its most recent edition, the fifth, was published in 2023 by Cambridge University Press. This book uses SI units (what it calls the mks convention) exclusively. A table for converting between SI and Gaussian units is given in Appendix C.

Griffiths said he was able to reduce the price of his textbook on quantum mechanics simply by changing the publisher, from Pearson Education to Cambridge University Press. He has done the same with this one. (See the ISBN in the box to the right.)

== Table of contents (5th edition) ==
- Preface
- Advertisement
- Chapter 1: Vector Analysis
- Chapter 2: Electrostatics
- Chapter 3: Potentials
- Chapter 4: Electric Fields in Matter
- Chapter 5: Magnetostatics
- Chapter 6: Magnetic Fields in Matter
- Chapter 7: Electrodynamics
- Intermission
- Chapter 8: Conservation Laws
- Chapter 9: Electromagnetic Waves
- Chapter 10: Potentials and Fields
- Chapter 11: Radiation
- Chapter 12: Electrodynamics and Relativity
- Appendix A: Vector Calculus in Curvilinear Coordinates
- Appendix B: The Helmholtz Theorem
- Appendix C: Units
- Index

== Reception ==
Paul D. Scholten, a professor at Miami University (Ohio), opined that the first edition of this book offers a streamlined, though not always in-depth, coverage of the fundamental physics of electrodynamics. Special topics such as superconductivity or plasma physics are not mentioned. Breaking with tradition, Griffiths did not give solutions to all the odd-numbered questions in the book. Another unique feature of the first edition is the informal, even emotional, tone. The author sometimes referred to the reader directly. Physics received the primary focus. Equations are derived and explained, and common misconceptions are addressed.

According to Robert W. Scharstein from the Department of Electrical Engineering at the University of Alabama, the mathematics used in the third edition is just enough to convey the subject and the problems are valuable teaching tools that do not involve the "plug and chug disease." Although students of electrical engineering are not expected to encounter complicated boundary-value problems in their career, (Note: Actually this is true about most of branches in electrical engineering, not all of them. See list of textbooks in electromagnetism for more information.) this book is useful to them as well, because of its emphasis on conceptual rather than mathematical issues. He argued that with this book, it is possible to skip the more mathematically involved sections to the more conceptually interesting topics, such as antennas. Moreover, the tone is clear and entertaining. Using this book "rejuvenated" his enthusiasm for teaching the subject.

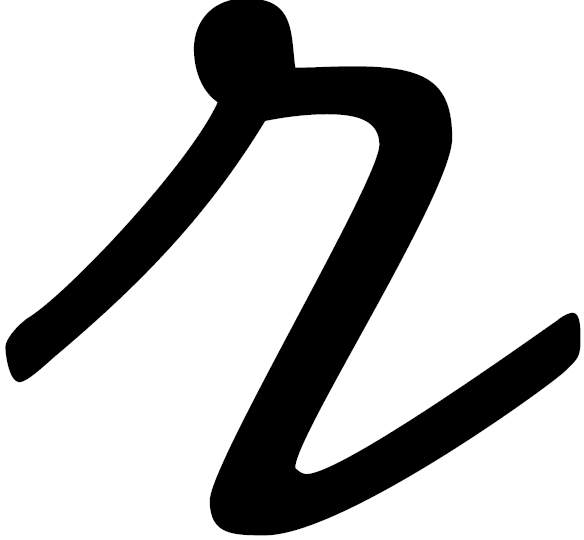
The script-r used in the book.

Colin Inglefield, an associate professor of physics at Weber State University (Utah), commented that the third edition is notable for its informal and conversational style that may appeal to a large class of students. The ordering of its chapters and its contents are fairly standard and are similar to texts at the same level. The first chapter offers a valuable review of vector calculus, which is essential for understanding this subject. While most other authors, including those aimed at a more advanced audience, denote the distance from the source point to the field point by $|\mathbf{x} - \mathbf{x}'|$, Griffiths uses a script $r$ (see figure). (Note: Griffiths' Reed College faculty website contains a special script for creating $r$ in LaTeX.) Unlike some comparable books, the level of mathematical sophistication is not particularly high. For example, Green's functions are not anywhere mentioned. Instead, physical intuition and conceptual understanding are emphasized. In fact, care is taken to address common misconceptions and pitfalls. It contains no computer exercises. Nevertheless, it is perfectly adequate for undergraduate instruction in physics. As of June 2005, Inglefield has taught three semesters using this book.

Physicists Yoni Kahn of Princeton University and Adam Anderson of the Fermi National Accelerator Laboratory indicated that Griffiths' Electrodynamics offers a dependable treatment of all materials in the electromagnetism section of the Physics Graduate Record Examinations (Physics GRE) except circuit analysis.

== Editions ==
- Griffiths, David J. (1981). Introduction to Electrodynamics (1st ed.). Prentice Hall. ISBN 0-13-481374-X. OCLC 6092643.
- Griffiths, David J. (1989). Introduction to Electrodynamics (2nd ed.). Prentice Hall. ISBN 0-13-481367-7. OCLC 18988461.
- Griffiths, David J. (1999). Introduction to Electrodynamics (3rd ed.). Prentice Hall. ISBN 0-13-805326-X. OCLC 40251748.
- Griffiths, David J. (2013). Introduction to Electrodynamics (4th ed.). Pearson. ISBN 978-0-321-85656-2. OCLC 794711764.
- Griffiths, David J. (2023). Introduction to Electrodynamics (5th ed.). Cambridge University Press. ISBN 978-1-009-39775-9.

== See also ==
- Introduction to Quantum Mechanics by the same author
- Classical Electrodynamics by John David Jackson, a commonly used graduate-level textbook.
- List of textbooks in electromagnetism
