= Ramamurti Shankar =

American physicist

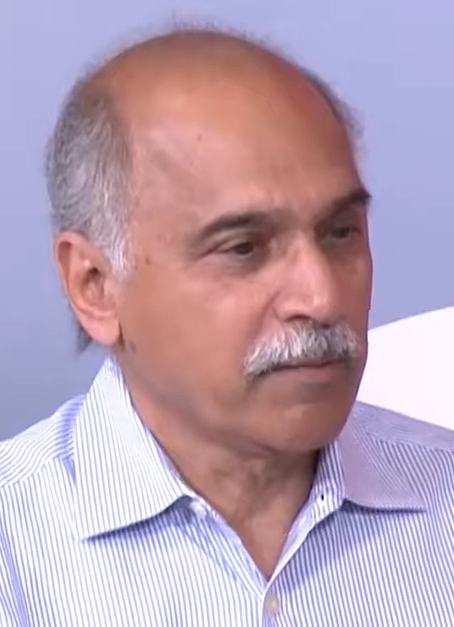
- Shankar in 2018
- Born: April 28, 1947 (age 79); New Delhi, British India
- Citizenship: United States
- Education: IIT Madras (B.Tech.); University of California, Berkeley (Ph.D.)
- Known for: Renormalization group approach to Fermi liquid theory Hamiltonian theory of the fractional quantum Hall effect Exact S-matrices in 2D field theories (with Witten); Principles of Quantum Mechanics; Open Yale Courses
- Awards: A.P. Sloan Fellowship (1982–86); Harwood F. Byrnes/Richard B. Sewall Teaching Prize (2005); Julius Edgar Lilienfeld Prize (2009); Distinguished Alumnus Award, IIT Madras (2013)
- Scientific career
- Fields: Theoretical condensed matter physics Quantum field theory
- Workplaces: Yale University
- Thesis: Exploitation of the Small Pion Mass in Multi-Regge Theory (1974)
- Website: campuspress.yale.edu/rshankar/

Ramamurti Shankar (born April 28, 1947) is an American theoretical physicist who is the Josiah Willard Gibbs Professor of Physics and Professor of Applied Physics at Yale University. His research spans theoretical condensed matter physics and quantum field theory, with major contributions to the renormalization group theory of Fermi liquids, the fractional quantum Hall effect, and exact solutions in statistical mechanics.

== Education ==
Shankar was born in New Delhi into a Tamil family. His elder brother was theoretical physicist Ramamurti Rajaraman. He received his B.Tech. in electrical engineering from the Indian Institute of Technology Madras in 1969 and his Ph.D. in theoretical particle physics from the University of California, Berkeley in 1974.

== Career ==
From 1974 to 1977, Shankar was a Junior Fellow at the Harvard Society of Fellows, the second Indian after S. Chandrasekhar to hold this position. He joined Yale in 1977 as J.W. Gibbs Instructor of Physics, became a full professor in 1988, and chaired the department from 2001 to 2007. He was appointed John Randolph Huffman Professor of Physics in 2004 and Josiah Willard Gibbs Professor of Physics in 2019.

== Research ==
=== Particle physics and field theory ===
Shankar's early work was in theoretical particle physics. During his time at Berkeley and the Harvard Society of Fellows, he worked on S-matrix theory, the determination of the quark–gluon coupling constant, and parity violation in electron–positron annihilation (with Sheldon Glashow and Alberto De Rújula). With Edward Witten, he computed exact S-matrices for two-dimensional field theories, including the supersymmetric sigma model and the kinks of the Gross–Neveu model.

=== Renormalization group and Fermi liquid theory ===
Shankar is known for applying renormalization group methods to interacting fermions in dimensions greater than one, providing a field-theoretic foundation for Landau's Fermi liquid theory. His 1994 review article in Reviews of Modern Physics demonstrated that the Landau parameters emerge as marginal couplings at the Fermi surface fixed point, and that the BCS coupling is marginally relevant for attractive interactions, providing a controlled derivation of the superconducting instability.

=== Fractional quantum Hall effect ===
With his former student Ganpathy Murthy, Shankar developed a Hamiltonian theory of the fractional quantum Hall effect using composite fermions. Their approach, based on Chern–Simons theory with flux attachment followed by a transformation incorporating correlation holes, provided a framework for computing gaps, masses, and polarization of fractional quantum Hall states. They later extended this framework to fractionally filled Chern bands.

=== Statistical mechanics and other contributions ===
Shankar obtained exact results for the random bond Ising model using the replica trick, the renormalization group, and bosonization. He also contributed to the theory of the integer quantum Hall effect transition (with M.P.A. Fisher, A.W.W. Ludwig, and G. Grinstein), the relationship between bulk wave functions and edge correlations in topological superconductors (with Ashvin Vishwanath), and chaotic quantum dots with disorder and interactions.

== Teaching and public outreach ==
Shankar's lectures for Yale's introductory physics courses (Physics 200 and 201), recorded as part of Open Yale Courses, have been viewed over 40 million times on YouTube and other platforms, with subtitles available in Chinese. He designed and taught Physics 301a, a bridge course in mathematics for undergraduates, for nearly a decade; the textbook he wrote for it, Basic Training in Mathematics, is used at Yale and other institutions.

== Selected publications ==
=== Books ===
- Principles of Quantum Mechanics, Plenum, 1980; 2nd ed. 1994. Translated into Polish (2006).
- Basic Training in Mathematics: A Fitness Program for Science Students, Plenum, 1995.
- Fundamentals of Physics: Mechanics, Relativity, and Thermodynamics, Yale University Press, 2014.
- Fundamentals of Physics II: Electromagnetism, Optics, and Quantum Mechanics, Yale University Press, 2016.
- Quantum Field Theory and Condensed Matter: An Introduction, Cambridge University Press, 2017.

His books have been translated into Polish, Greek, and Chinese.

=== Selected articles ===
- Shankar, R. (1994). "Renormalization-group approach to interacting fermions". Reviews of Modern Physics. 66 (1): 129–192. Bibcode:1994RvMP...66..129S. doi:10.1103/RevModPhys.66.129.
- Murthy, G.; Shankar, R. (2003). "Hamiltonian theories of the fractional quantum Hall effect". Reviews of Modern Physics. 75 (4): 1101–1158. arXiv:cond-mat/0205326. Bibcode:2003RvMP...75.1101M. doi:10.1103/RevModPhys.75.1101.

== Awards and honours ==
- A.P. Sloan Fellowship (1982–1986)
- Fellow of the American Physical Society (2001)
- Harwood F. Byrnes/Richard B. Sewall Teaching Prize, Yale University (2005)
- Julius Edgar Lilienfeld Prize, American Physical Society (2009), for "innovative applications of field theoretic techniques to quantum condensed matter systems"
- Distinguished Alumnus Award, IIT Madras (2013)
- Elected to the American Academy of Arts and Sciences (2014)

== Professional service ==
Shankar has served on the editorial board of the Journal of Statistical Physics, the Dannie Heineman Prize and Lilienfeld Prize committees of the APS, the Committee of Visitors at the National Science Foundation, the advisory board of the Kavli Institute for Theoretical Physics, and as a trustee and executive committee member of the Aspen Center for Physics. He served on the jury for the Infosys Prize in Physical Sciences in 2023 and 2024. He has held visiting positions at the École Normale Supérieure, MIT, University of California, Berkeley, and KITP Santa Barbara (as Simons Professor).

== Personal life ==
His elder brother, Ramamurti Rajaraman, was a theoretical physicist known for his work on solitons.
