= John R. Taylor =

British-born American physicist

John Robert Taylor
- Born: February 2, 1939 (age 87)
- Awards: Emmy Award

Academic background
- Education: Cambridge University (B.A.), University of California, Berkeley (Ph.D.)
- Doctoral advisor: Geoffrey Chew

Academic work
- Discipline: Physics
- Institutions: University of Colorado, Boulder
- Notable works: An Introduction to Error Analysis, Classical Mechanics

John Robert Taylor is a British-born emeritus professor of physics at the University of Colorado, Boulder.

He received his B.A. in mathematics at Cambridge University, and his Ph.D. from the University of California, Berkeley in 1963 with thesis advisor Geoffrey Chew. Taylor has written several college-level physics textbooks. His bestselling book is An Introduction to Error Analysis, which has been translated into nine languages. His intermediate-level undergraduate textbook, Classical Mechanics, was well-reviewed.

== Awards ==
Taylor was designated a Presidential Teaching Scholar in 1991. He has also received an Emmy Award for his television series Physics 4 Fun (1988–1990).
