= Richard Söderberg =

Carl Richard Söderberg
- Born: February 3, 1895; Ulvöhamn, Sweden
- Died: October 17, 1979 (aged 84); Cambridge, Massachusetts, United States
- Citizenship: American, Swedish
- Education: Chalmers University of Technology; MIT
- Known for: power engineering
- Scientific career
- Fields: Engineering
- Workplaces: MIT

Carl Richard "Dick" Söderberg (February 3, 1895 – October 17, 1979) was a power engineer and Institute Professor at the Massachusetts Institute of Technology.

== Background ==
Söderberg was born in the fishing village of Ulvöhamn in present Örnsköldsvik Municipality, Västernorrland County, Sweden. He enrolled at the Chalmers University of Technology in Gothenburg. In 1919 he graduated with a degree in naval architecture. On a fellowship from The American-Scandinavian Foundation, he came to MIT, where he was awarded the degree of Bachelor of Science in June 1920.

== Career ==
In 1922, Söderberg started at the Westinghouse Electric and Manufacturing Company. In 1928, he accepted an offer from ASEA to return to Sweden and head the development of a new line of large turbogenerators. In 1930, he returned to Westinghouse, where he was assigned to the Power Engineering Department.

In 1938, Söderberg was offered a faculty appointment in the Department of Mechanical Engineering at MIT. In 1954, he was appointed dean of the School of Engineering. He resigned as dean in 1959 and was appointed to the position of Institute Professor. Söderberg had a total of eighteen U.S. patents issued in the years from 1935 to 1950, all relating to constructional features of turbines.

Söderberg was a member of many professional societies. He was elected to the United States National Academy of Sciences in 1947. He was elected an honorary member of the American Society of Mechanical Engineers in 1967. He was elected to the National Academy of Engineering in 1974 for “leadership in turbine design and innovation in engineering education.” He was also a fellow of the American Academy of Arts and Sciences and the Royal Swedish Academy of Engineering Sciences.

In 1958 he was made a knight of the Order of the Polar Star by the King of Sweden and in 1968 a commander of the Royal Order of the North Star.

On the occasion of Söderberg's eightieth birthday in 1975, MIT announced the establishment of the Carl Richard Soderberg Professorship of Power Engineering.

Söderberg died of cancer on October 17, 1979.

== Selected works ==
- The Mechanical Engineering Department (Massachusetts Institute of Technology. 1947)
- My Life (Public Relations Group. 1979)

== Other sources ==
- Benson, Adolph B. and Naboth Hedin, eds. (1938) Swedes in America, 1638–1938 (The Swedish American Tercentenary Association. New Haven, CT: Yale University Press) ISBN 978-0-8383-0326-9
- Carl Richard Söderberg, Stephen P. Timoshenko (National Research Council. Biographical Memoirs V.53. Washington, DC: The National Academies Press, 1982.) ISBN 978-0-309-03287-2
