= J. J. Sakurai =

Japanese-American physicist (1933–1982)

- 桜井 純
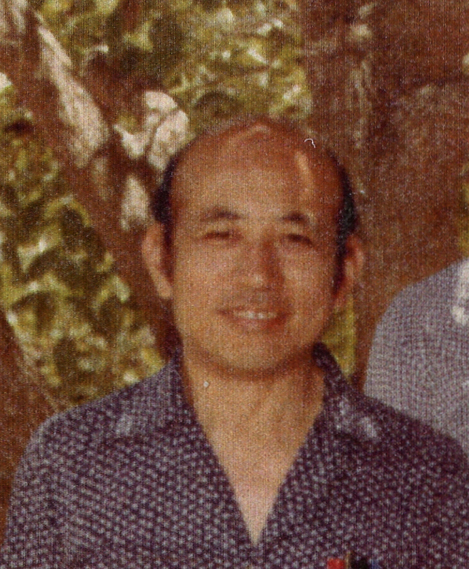
- J.J. Sakurai in 1979
- Born: January 31, 1933; Tokyo, Japan
- Died: November 1, 1982 (aged 49); Geneva, Switzerland
- Education: Bronx High School of Science; Harvard University; Cornell University
- Known for: Modern Quantum Mechanics
- Scientific career
- Fields: Physics
- Workplaces: University of Chicago; University of California, Los Angeles; California Institute of Technology; Universities of Tokyo and Nagoya; University of Paris at Orsay; Scuola Normale Superiore at Pisa; Stanford Linear Accelerator; CERN at Geneva; Max Planck Institute at Munich
- Thesis: A theory of weak interactions (1958)
- Doctoral advisor: Hans Bethe

Jun John Sakurai (桜井 純, Sakurai Jun; January 31, 1933 – November 1, 1982) was a Japanese–American theoretical particle physicist.

While a graduate student at Cornell University, Sakurai independently discovered the V-A theory of weak interactions.

He authored the popular graduate text Modern Quantum Mechanics (1985, published posthumously) and other texts such as Invariance Principles and Elementary Particles (1964) and Advanced Quantum Mechanics (1967).

== Life and career ==
J. J. Sakurai was born in Tokyo in 1933 and moved to the United States when he was a high school student. He studied physics at Harvard and Cornell, where he proposed his theory of weak interactions. After receiving his PhD from Cornell in 1958 he joined the faculty at University of Chicago, becoming a full professor in 1964. In 1970, Sakurai moved to the University of California, Los Angeles.

As a graduate student, he proposed the V−A theory of weak interactions, independently of Robert Marshak, George Sudarshan, Richard Feynman, and Murray Gell-Mann. In 1960, he published a paper on the theory of strong interactions based on Abelian and non-Abelian (Yang-Mills) gauge invariance.

In that paper, he also pioneered the vector meson dominance model of hadron dynamics.

Sakurai died from an aneurysm in 1982 during a visit to CERN.

== Textbooks ==
In addition to his published papers, Sakurai authored several textbooks. These include Invariance Principles and Elementary Particles (1964), Advanced Quantum Mechanics (1967), and Modern Quantum Mechanics. The third volume was left unfinished due to Sakurai's sudden death in 1982, but was later edited and completed with the help of his wife, Noriko Sakurai, and colleague San Fu Tuan. Modern Quantum Mechanics is probably his most well known book and is still widely used for graduate studies today.

== Sakurai Prize ==
In 1984 the family and friends of J. J. Sakurai endowed a prize for theoretical physicists in his honor. The goal of the prize as stated on the APS website is to encourage outstanding work in the field of particle theory. Recipients receive a $10,000 grant, an allowance for travel to the ceremony, and a certificate citing their contributions to particle physics.

== See also ==
- Sakurai Prize
