= David J. Griffiths =

American physicist and textbook author

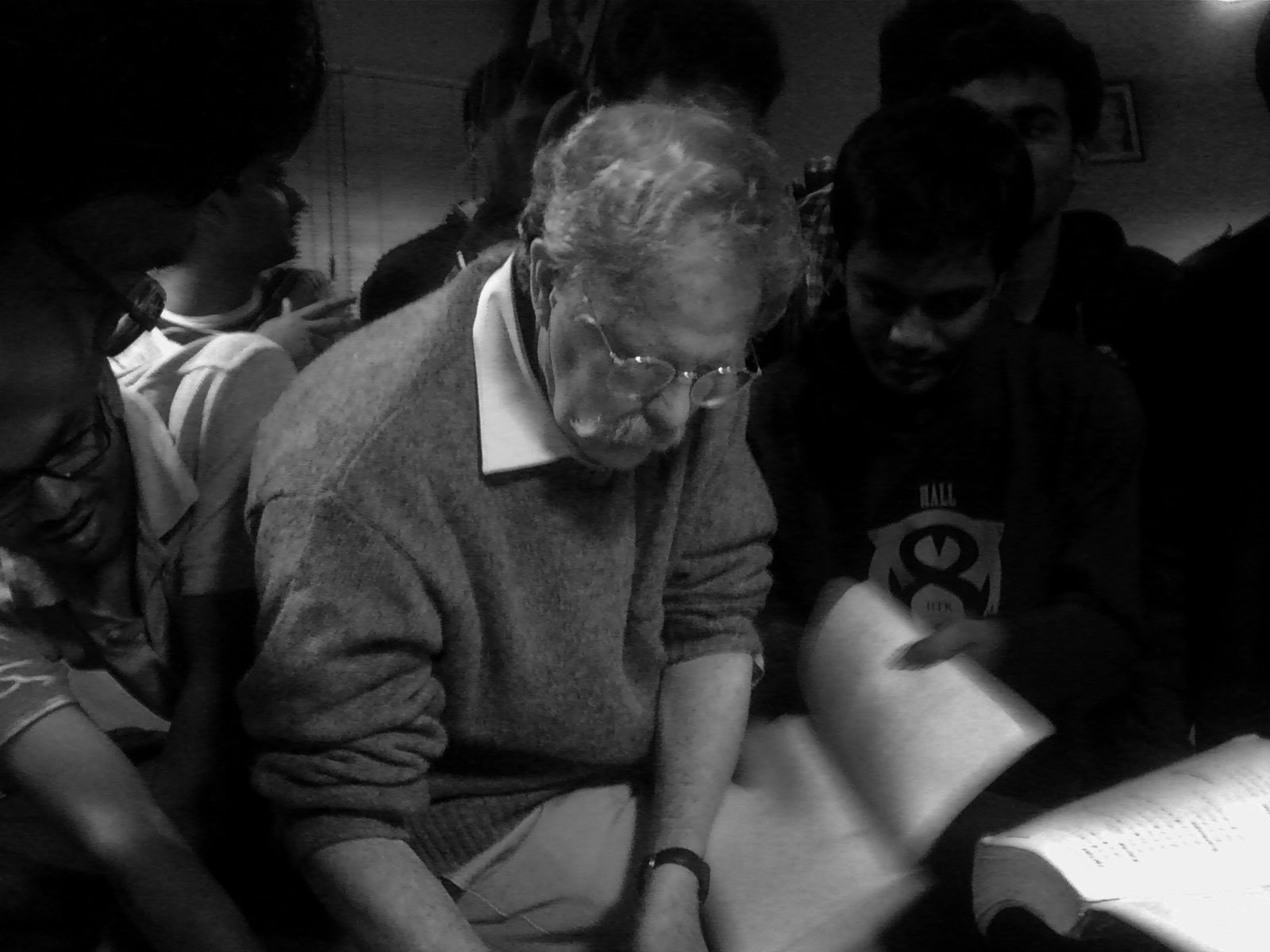
- Griffiths in 2014
- Born: David Jeffrey Griffiths; 5 December 1942 (age 83); Arlington, Virginia, United States
- Education: Harvard University
- Known for: Undergraduate textbooks
- Scientific career
- Fields: Particle physics Electromagnetism
- Workplaces: Reed College
- Thesis: Covariant Approach to Massless Field Theory in the Radiation Gauge (1970)
- Doctoral advisor: Sidney Coleman

David Jeffrey Griffiths (born December 5, 1942) is an American physicist and educator. He was on the faculty of Reed College from 1978 through 2009, becoming the Howard Vollum Professor of Science before his retirement. He wrote four highly regarded textbooks for undergraduate physics students.

== Early life and education ==
Griffiths was born in Arlington, Virginia, the son of Winifred Mary (née Jeffrey) and Gordon Griffiths. Both his parents were faculty members at the University of Washington, his father in the history department and his mother in the zoology department.

Griffiths is a graduate of The Putney School and was trained at Harvard University (B.A., 1964; M.A., 1966; Ph.D., 1970). His doctoral work, Covariant Approach to Massless Field Theory in the Radiation Gauge on theoretical particle physics, was supervised by Sidney Coleman.

== Career ==
Griffiths is principally known as the author of three highly regarded textbooks for undergraduate physics students: Introduction to Elementary Particles (published in 1987, second edition published 2008), Introduction to Quantum Mechanics (published in 1995, third edition published 2018), and Introduction to Electrodynamics (published in 1981, fifth edition published in 2023).

== Awards and honors ==
Griffiths was the recipient of the 1997 Robert A. Millikan Award reserved for "those who have made outstanding scholarly contributions to physics education".

In 2009 Griffiths was named a Fellow of the American Physical Society, cited "For advancing the upper level physics curriculum through the writing of leading textbooks and through his contributions to the American Journal of Physics in many editorial roles and as an author."

== Books ==
- Griffiths, David J. (2023). Introduction to Electrodynamics (5th ed.). Cambridge University Press. doi:10.1017/9781009397735. ISBN 978-1-009-39775-9.
- Griffiths, David J.; Schroeter, Darrell F. (2018). Introduction to Quantum Mechanics (3rd ed.). Cambridge University Press. ISBN 978-1-107-18963-8.
- Griffiths, David (December 10, 2020). Introduction to Elementary Particles. John Wiley & Sons. ISBN 978-3-527-83464-8.
- Griffiths, David J. (2012). Revolutions in Twentieth-Century Physics. Cambridge University Press. ISBN 978-1-107-60217-5.

The most recent edition of each book is generally regarded as a standard undergraduate text.

== See also ==
- List of textbooks in electromagnetism
- List of textbooks on classical mechanics and quantum mechanics
