= Tapan Sarkar =

Indian-American electrical engineer (1948–2021)

Tapan Kumar Sarkar
- Born: August 2, 1948; Kolkata, India
- Died: March 12, 2021 (aged 72); Syracuse, New York, U.S.
- Scientific career
- Education: IIT Kharagpur; University of New Brunswick; Syracuse University
- Known for: Generalized pencil-of-function method
- Awards: IEEE Electromagnetics Award (2020)
- Fields: Electrical engineering; Antenna theory; Computational electromagnetics
- Workplaces: General Instrument; Rochester Institute of Technology; Syracuse University
- Thesis: Analysis of arbitrarily oriented thin wire antenna arrays over imperfect ground planes (1975)
- Doctoral advisor: Bradley J. Strait
- Website: ecs.syr.edu/faculty/sarkar/index.html

Tapan Kumar Sarkar (August 2, 1948 – March 12, 2021) was an Indian-American electrical engineer and professor emeritus at the Department of Electrical Engineering and Computer Science at Syracuse University. He was best known for his contributions to computational electromagnetics and antenna theory.

Sarkar was the recipient of IEEE Electromagnetics Award in 2020.

== Biography ==
Sarkar was born on August 2, 1948, in Kolkata, India. He obtained his Bachelor of Technology from IIT Kharagpur and Master of Engineering from University of New Brunswick in 1969 and 1971, respectively. He received his Master of Science and Doctor of Philosophy degrees from Syracuse University in 1975.

Between 1975 and 1976, Sarkar worked for TACO Division of General Instrument. Between 1976 and 1985, he was a faculty member at Rochester Institute of Technology; he also briefly held a research fellowship position at Gordon McKay Laboratory for Applied Sciences in Harvard University in between 1977 and 1978. In 1985, he became a professor at Syracuse University and held the position until his death in 2021.

Sarkar acted as an associate editor for the IEEE Transactions on Electromagnetic Compatibility in between 1986 and 1989 and for IEEE Transactions on Antennas and Propagation in between 2004 and 2010. He was the 2014 president of IEEE Antennas & Propagation Society and the vice president of the Applied Computational Electromagnetics Society (ACES). Sarkar also served as board member for journals such as Digital Signal Processing, Journal of Electromagnetic Waves and Applications and Microwave and Optical Technology Letters. Sarkar was the president of OHRN Enterprises, Inc., an incorporated business specializing in computer services and system analysis.

He died on March 12, 2021, in Syracuse, New York.

== Research and awards ==
Sarkar's research interests focused on "numerical solutions of operator equations arising in electromagnetics and signal processing with application to system design." He is the author or co-author of more than 380 journal articles, as well as 16 books and, 32 book chapters. Along with his doctoral student Yingbo Hua, he developed the generalized pencil-of-function method for signal estimation with complex exponentials. Based on Sarkar's past work on the original pencil-of-function method, the technique is used in electromagnetic analyses of layered structures, antenna analysis and radar signal processing. He is also the co-author of the general purpose electromagnetic solver, HOBBIES.

In 2010, Sarkar was chosen as the IEEE Distinguished Lecturer in Antennas and Propagation Systems. In 2020, he received IEEE Electromagnetics Award "for contributions to the efficient and accurate solution of computational electromagnetic problems in frequency and time domain, and for research in adaptive antennas." He previously was the recipient of Best Paper Awards of the IEEE Transactions on Electromagnetic Compatibility in 1979 and National Radar Conference in the 1997.

Sarkar received honorary doctorate degrees from Blaise Pascal University, Technical University of Madrid and Aalto University, respectively in 1998, 2004 and 2012.

== Selected publications ==
Journal articles

- Sarkar, T.; Nebat, J.; Weiner, D.; Jain, V. (November 1980). "Suboptimal approximation/identification of transient waveforms from electromagnetic systems by pencil-of-function method". IEEE Transactions on Antennas and Propagation. 28 (6): 928–933. Bibcode:1980ITAP...28..928S. doi:10.1109/TAP.1980.1142411.
- Wei, Cao; Harrington, R. F.; Mautz, J. R.; Sarkar, T. K. (April 1984). "Multiconductor Transmission Lines In Multilayered Dielectric Media". IEEE Transactions on Microwave Theory and Techniques. 32 (4): 439–450. Bibcode:1984ITMTT..32..439W. doi:10.1109/TMTT.1984.1132696.
- Djordjevic, A. R.; Sarkar, T. K.; Harrington, R. F. (June 1986). "Analysis of Lossy Transmission Lines with Arbitrary Nonlinear Terminal Networks". IEEE Transactions on Microwave Theory and Techniques. 34 (6): 660–666. Bibcode:1986ITMTT..34..660D. doi:10.1109/TMTT.1986.1133414.
- Djordjevic, A. R.; Sarkar, T. K.; Harrington, R. F. (June 1987). "Time-domain response of multiconductor transmission lines". Proceedings of the IEEE. 75 (6): 743–764. doi:10.1109/PROC.1987.13797. S2CID 40311640.
- Hua, Y.; Sarkar, T. K. (February 1989). "Generalized pencil-of-function method for extracting poles of an EM system from its transient response". IEEE Transactions on Antennas and Propagation. 37 (2): 229–234. Bibcode:1989ITAP...37..229H. doi:10.1109/8.18710. S2CID 122969497.
- Hua, Y.; Sarkar, T. K. (May 1990). "Matrix pencil method for estimating parameters of exponentially damped/undamped sinusoids in noise". IEEE Transactions on Acoustics, Speech, and Signal Processing. 38 (5): 814–824. doi:10.1109/29.56027.
- Hu, Fengduo; Sarkar, T. K.; Hua, Yingbo (January 1993). "Utilization of Bandpass Filtering for the Matrix Pencil Method". IEEE Transactions on Signal Processing. 41 (1): 442–446. Bibcode:1993ITSP...41..442H. doi:10.1109/TSP.1993.193174. S2CID 206795645.
- Sarkar, T. K.; Pereira, O. (February 1995). "Using the matrix pencil method to estimate the parameters of a sum of complex exponentials". IEEE Antennas and Propagation Magazine. 37 (1): 48–55. Bibcode:1995IAPM...37...48S. doi:10.1109/74.370583.
- Sarkar, T.K.; Ji, Z.; Kim, K.; Medouri, A.; Salazar-Palma, M. (2003). "A survey of various propagation models for mobile communication". IEEE Antennas and Propagation Magazine. 45 (3): 51–82. Bibcode:2003IAPM...45...51S. doi:10.1109/MAP.2003.1232163.

Books

- Salazar-Palma, M.; Sarkar, T.K.; Garcia-Costillo, L.E.; Roy, T.; Djordevic, A. (1998). Iterative and Self-Adaptive Finite-Elements in Electromagnetic Modeling. Artech House. ISBN 978-0890068953.
- Salazar-Palma, M.; Sarkar, T.K.; Wicks, M.C. (2002). Wavelet Application in Engineering Electromagnetics. Artech House. ISBN 9781580532679.
- Sarkar, T.K.; Wicks, M.C.; Salazar-Palma, M.; Bonneau, R.J. (2005). Smart Antennas. Wiley-IEEE Press. ISBN 978-0-471-72123-9.
- Sarkar, T.K.; Salazar-Palma, M.; Mokole, E.L. (2008). Physics of Multiantenna Systems and Broadband Processing. Wiley-IEEE Press. ISBN 978-0-470-28923-5.
- Zhang, Y.; Sarkar, T.K. (2009). Parallel Solution of Integral Equation-Based EM Problems in the Frequency Domain. Wiley-IEEE Press. ISBN 9780470405451.
