= Roger F. Harrington =

American electrical engineer and professor

- Born: Roger Fuller Harrington; December 24, 1925 (age 100); Buffalo, New York, U.S.
- Education: Syracuse University; Ohio State University
- Known for: Method of moments; Chu–Harrington limit; Characteristic mode analysis; PMCHWT integral equation
- Awards: IEEE Fellow Award (1968); IEEE Centennial Medal (1984); IEEE AP-S Distinguished Achievement Award (1989); IEEE Electromagnetics Award (2000); Benjamin Franklin Medal (2015)
- Scientific career
- Fields: Electrical engineering; Antenna theory; Computational electromagnetics
- Workplaces: Radio Materiel School; Syracuse University; University of Arizona
- Thesis: Solution to some electromagnetic boundary value problems (1952)
- Doctoral advisor: Victor H. Rumsey
- Doctoral students: Donald H. Sinnott

Roger Fuller Harrington (born December 24, 1925) is an American electrical engineer and professor emeritus at Syracuse University. He is best known for his contributions to computational electromagnetics with his development of method of moments (MoM). Harrington's 1968 book, Field Computation by Moment Methods, is regarded as a pivotal textbook on the subject.

== Biography ==
Harrington was born on December 24, 1925, in Buffalo, New York. He started majoring in electrical engineering in 1943 at Syracuse University; his studies were interrupted in the following year by World War II. During this time, he served as an instructor under the Electronics Training Program at the U.S. Naval Radio Materiel School in Dearborn, Michigan, while working as an electronics technician. He completed his studies after the war, receiving B.S. and M.S. degrees in 1948 and 1950, respectively. Briefly remaining at Syracuse University as a research assistant and instructor, he started his doctoral studies under Victor H. Rumsey at Ohio State University, receiving his PhD in 1952.

Harrington returned to Syracuse University following his doctoral studies, working there as a professor until his retirement in 1994. Following his retirement, he briefly worked as a visiting professor at University of Arizona. During his tenure at Syracuse University, he has worked on research projects for the U.S. Army Signal Corps, Office of Naval Research, General Electric and the U.S. Air Force Office of Scientific Research. He has also held visiting professorship positions at University of Illinois in between 1959 and 1960, University of California, Berkeley in 1964 and the Technical University of Denmark in 1969.

Harrington is a recipient of IEEE Centennial Medal, IEEE Antennas and Propagation Society Distinguished Achievement Award and IEEE Electromagnetics Award in 1984, 1989 and 2000, respectively. In 2014, he was awarded the Benjamin Franklin Medal in electrical engineering for his contributions to the study of electromagnetics. He currently resides in Wheaton, Illinois with his daughter.

== Research ==
Harrington has published two standard engineering textbooks, Introduction to Electromagnetic Engineering in 1958 and Time-Harmonic Electromagnetic Fields in 1961. In 1968, he published Field Computation by Moment Methods, which introduced the unified and generalized theory of method of moments (MoM), an integral equation method for solving electromagnetic problems. The development of the method stemmed from Harrington's initial interest in using electromagnetic fields in thermonuclear fusion research. Harrington further developed the method in his future publications; method of moments later became one of go-to methods in the study of antennas, integrated circuits and waveguides, among others. Harrington's further work included the study of radiation and scattering in bodies of revolution, dielectric scattering, field integral equations and theory of characteristic modes.

Harrington also expanded Lan Jen Chu and Harold Alden Wheeler's theory on the fundamental limits of electrically small radio antennas; Chu–Harrington limit, which yields a lower bound for the Q factor of a small radio antenna, is named after him.

== Selected publications ==
Articles

- Harrington, Roger F. (1960). "Effects of antenna size on gain, bandwidth, and efficiency". Journal of National Bureau of Standards. 64-D: 1–12.
- Harrington, R. F. (February 1967). "Matrix methods for field problems". Proceedings of the IEEE. 55 (2): 136–149. doi:10.1109/PROC.1967.5433.
- Mautz, J. R.; Harrington, R. F. (1969). "Radiation and scattering from bodies of revolution". Applied Scientific Research. 20 (1): 405–435. Bibcode:1969FTC....20..405M. doi:10.1007/BF00382412.
- Harrington, R. F.; Mautz, J. R. (1971). "Theory of characteristic modes for conducting bodies". IEEE Transactions on Antennas and Propagation. 19 (5): 622–628. Bibcode:1971ITAP...19..622H. doi:10.1109/TAP.1971.1139999.
- Chang, Y.; Harrington, R. F. (1977). "A surface formulation for characteristic modes of material bodies". IEEE Transactions on Antennas and Propagation. 25 (6): 789–795. Bibcode:1977ITAP...25..789C. doi:10.1109/TAP.1977.1141685.
- Harrington, R. F. (1978). "Reactively controlled directive arrays". IEEE Transactions on Antennas and Propagation. 26 (3): 390–395. Bibcode:1978ITAP...26..390H. doi:10.1109/TAP.1978.1141852.
- Wei, Cao; Harrington, R. F.; Mautz, J. R.; Sarkar, T. K. (April 1984). "Multiconductor Transmission Lines In Multilayered Dielectric Media". IEEE Transactions on Microwave Theory and Techniques. 32 (4): 439–450. Bibcode:1984ITMTT..32..439W. doi:10.1109/TMTT.1984.1132696.
- Djordjevic, A. R.; Sarkar, T. K.; Harrington, R. F. (June 1986). "Analysis of Lossy Transmission Lines with Arbitrary Nonlinear Terminal Networks". IEEE Transactions on Microwave Theory and Techniques. 34 (6): 660–666. Bibcode:1986ITMTT..34..660D. doi:10.1109/TMTT.1986.1133414.
- Djordjevic, A. R.; Sarkar, T. K.; Harrington, R. F. (June 1987). "Time-domain response of multiconductor transmission lines". Proceedings of the IEEE. 75 (6): 743–764. doi:10.1109/PROC.1987.13797. S2CID 40311640.
- Rautio, J. C.; Harrington, R. F. (August 1987). "An Electromagnetic Time-Harmonic Analysis of Shielded Microstrip Circuits". IEEE Transactions on Microwave Theory and Techniques. 35 (8): 726–730. Bibcode:1987ITMTT..35..726R. doi:10.1109/TMTT.1987.1133738.
- Harrington, Roger F. (1989). "Boundary Integral Formulations for Homogeneous Material Bodies". Journal of Electromagnetic Waves and Applications. 3 (1): 1–15. Bibcode:1989JEWA....3....1H. doi:10.1163/156939389X00016.

Books

- Harrington, Roger F. (1958). Introduction to Electromagnetic Engineering. McGraw-Hill. ISBN 9780486432410.
- Harrington, Roger F. (1961). Time-Harmonic Electromagnetic Fields. McGraw-Hill. ISBN 9780070267459.
- Harrington, Roger F. (1968). Field Computation by Moment Methods. Macmillan. ISBN 9780780310148.

Book chapters

- Harrington, R. F.; Mautz, J. R. (1978). "Computational Methods for Transmission of Waves Through Apertures". In Uslenghi, Piergiorgio (ed.). Electromagnetic Scattering. New York: Academic Press. pp. 429–470. ISBN 9780323142434.

== See also ==
- List of textbooks in electromagnetism
