= Pencil (disambiguation) =

A pencil is a handheld instrument used to write and draw, usually on paper.

Pencil may also refer to:

- Pencil (film), a 2016 Tamil film
- Pencil (optics), a beam of radiant energy in the form of a narrow cone or cylinder
- Pencil (geometry), a family of geometric objects
- Pencil2D, an open-source drawing and animation app
- Apple Pencil, a stylus device released by Apple Inc.
- Matrix pencil, a pair of matrices used in a generalized eigenvalue problem
- Pencil, a character from the first season of Battle for Dream Island, an animated web series
- Pencil, a fictional character from the animated series Rock Paper Scissors

== See also ==
- Flying pencil (disambiguation)
- Penciller, a stage in the creation of a comic book
- Pinsel (disambiguation)
