= Jean van Bladel =

Belgian engineer

- Born: July 24, 1922; Antwerp, Belgium
- Died: January 24, 2018 (aged 95); Westende, Belgium
- Education: Université libre de Bruxelles; University of Wisconsin–Madison
- Awards: IEEE Heinrich Hertz Medal (1995)
- Scientific career
- Fields: Electrical engineering
- Workplaces: Ghent University; University of Wisconsin–Madison
- Thesis: Wave Propagation in Cylindrical Structures Containing Several Longitudinal Media (1950)
- Doctoral students: Kenneth K. Mei

Jean G. van Bladel (July 24, 1922 – January 24, 2018) was a Belgian electrical engineer, physicist and academician, who was a Professor Emeritus at Ghent University. He was best known for his contributions to electromagnetics and antenna theory.

== Biography ==
Jean van Bladel was born on July 24, 1922, in Antwerp, Belgium to a French-speaking family. His father was a barrister. In 1939, he was accepted to the Belgian Royal Military Academy. In the same year and at the beginnings of World War II, he and his military cohort was forced to flee to southern France during the invasion of Belgium; during his return, he became a prisoner of war as his train was intercepted by German forces. Returning to Belgium later in 1940, he resumed his engineering studies at Université libre de Bruxelles. Soon, he had to transfer to University of Liège when the rector of the university refused to collaborate with German occupiers, after which the university was closed. He obtained his bachelor's degrees in electromechanical and radio engineering from Université libre de Bruxelles in 1947 and 1948, respectively.

In 1948, van Bladel moved to the United States to pursue his graduate studies under a scholarship by Belgian American Educational Foundation. He received masters and PhD degrees in electrical engineering from the University of Wisconsin–Madison in 1949 and 1950, respectively. He worked as the head of the Radar Department at Manufacture BeIge de Lampes et de Materiel Electronique in between 1950 and 1954; following this, he worked as an assistant professor at Washington University in St. Louis for two years. In 1956, he returned to his alma mater, University of Wisconsin–Madison, to become an associate professor and was promoted to full professorship in 1960. In 1964, he returned to Belgium to become a professor at Ghent University, where he founded the Laboratory of Electromagnetism and Acoustics. Between 1976 and 1978, he served as the Dean of the Faculty of Applied Science of the university and retired in 1987.

Van Bladel died on January 24, 2018, in Westende, Belgium. He was survived by his wife Hjördis Van Bladel, his three children and four grandchildren.

== Research and teaching ==
Van Bladel's research work focused on electromagnetics, antenna theory, special relativity, electromagnetic singularities and dyadics. His 1963 work on the numerical characterization of scattering with his PhD student K. K. Mei was one of the first works in computational electromagnetics literature to use method of moments. He has also adopted special relativity in his research to solve engineering problems, such as those pertaining to interactions in rotational and translational media, and scattering from moving objects. In 1995, he received IEEE Heinrich Hertz Medal for "major contributions in fundamental electromagnetic theory and its application to electrical engineering."

In addition to his research work, he is known for his textbook, Electromagnetic Fields (1964). He has also authored the textbooks, Les Applications du Radar à I'Astronomie et à la Météorologie (1955), Relativity and Engineering (1984), Singular Electromagnetic Fields and Sources (1991).

== Publications ==
=== Journal articles ===
- Mei, K.; Van Bladel, J. (1963). "Scattering by perfectly-conducting rectangular cylinders". IEEE Transactions on Antennas and Propagation. 11 (2): 185–192. Bibcode:1963ITAP...11..185M. doi:10.1109/TAP.1963.1137996.
- Van Bladel, J. (1975). "On the resonances of a dielectric resonator of very high permittivity". IEEE Transactions on Microwave Theory and Techniques. 23 (2): 199–208. Bibcode:1975ITMTT..23..199V. doi:10.1109/TMTT.1975.1128528.
- Van Bladel, J. (1976). "Electromagnetic fields in the presence of rotating bodies". Proceedings of the IEEE. 64 (3): 301–318. Bibcode:1976IEEEP..64..301V. doi:10.1109/PROC.1976.10111.
- De Meulenaere, F.; Van Bladel, J. (1977). "Polarizability of some small apertures". IEEE Transactions on Antennas and Propagation. 25 (2): 198–205. Bibcode:1977ITAP...25..198D. doi:10.1109/TAP.1977.1141568.

=== Books ===
- Van Bladel, J. (1955). Les Applications du Radar à l'Astronomie et à la Météorologie. Gauthier-Villars.
- Van Bladel, J. (1964). Electromagnetic Fields. John Wiley & Sons. ISBN 9783540125617.
- Van Bladel, J. (1984). Relativity and Engineering. Springer. ISBN 9783540125617.
- Van Bladel, J. (1991). Singular Electromagnetic Fields and Sources. Oxford University Press. ISBN 9780780311534.

== See also ==
- List of textbooks in electromagnetism
