= Kenneth K. Mei =

- Born: Kwan Hsiang Mei; May 19, 1932; Shanghai, Republic of China
- Died: February 16, 2017 (aged 84); Oakland, California, U.S.
- Education: National Taiwan University; University of Wisconsin–Madison (BS, MS, PhD)
- Known for: Contributions to computational electromagnetics
- Awards: IEEE Electromagnetics Award (2007)
- Scientific career
- Fields: Electrical engineering
- Workplaces: University of California, Berkeley; City University of Hong Kong
- Thesis: Scattering of radio waves by rectangular cylinders (1962)
- Doctoral advisor: Jean van Bladel

Kenneth Kwan Hsiang Mei (Chinese: 梅冠香; May 19, 1932 – February 16, 2017) was a Taiwanese-American electrical engineer and academic, who was a professor emeritus at Department of Electrical Engineering and Computer Science at University of California, Berkeley. From 1994 until his death, he was also a professor of electrical engineering at City University of Hong Kong. He is best known for his contributions to computational electromagnetics.

== Biography ==
Kenneth Kwan Hsiang Mei was born on May 19, 1932 in Shanghai and served an interpreter in Korean War. Studying physics at National University of Taiwan in the 1950s for a year, he later emigrated to the United States, and received a bachelor's degree in electrical engineering from University of Wisconsin–Madison. He obtained his masters and PhD degrees from University of Wisconsin–Madison in 1960 and 1962, respectively; during his doctoral studies, he was advised by Jean van Bladel.

In 1962, Mei joined the Department of Electrical Engineering at University of California, Berkeley, where he was a professor until his retirement in July 1994. From 1994 until 2001, he was a Chair Professor at the institution, and served as the director of the Wireless Communications Research Center. In 2007, he received the title of honorary professor. Being elected as an IEEE fellow in 1979, he received IEEE Electromagnetics Award in 2009 for "contributions to computational electromagnetics and Maxwellian circuits."

Mei's research has focused on numerical techniques for electromagnetic problems in microwave and antenna theory; he has published early research work on method of moments during the early 1960s. His later work involved innovations in the application of finite difference and finite element methods to antenna and scattering problems. He has also introduced a superabsorption method in 1989 and measured equation of invariance (MEI) approach in 1992, as well as developing the concept of Maxwellian circuits.

Mei died on February 16, 2017 in Oakland, California.

== Selected publications ==
Journal articles

- Mei, K.; Van Bladel, J. (March 1963). "Scattering by perfectly-conducting rectangular cylinders". IEEE Transactions on Antennas and Propagation. 11 (2): 185–192. Bibcode:1963ITAP...11..185M. doi:10.1109/TAP.1963.1137996.
- Mei, K. (May 1965). "On the integral equations of thin wire antennas". IEEE Transactions on Antennas and Propagation. 13 (3): 374–378. Bibcode:1965ITAP...13..374M. doi:10.1109/TAP.1965.1138432.
- Mei, K (November 1974). "Unimoment method of solving antenna and scattering problems". IEEE Transactions on Antennas and Propagation. 22 (6): 760–766. Bibcode:1974ITAP...22..760M. doi:10.1109/TAP.1974.1140894.
- Xiaolei, Zhang; Mei, K. K. (December 1988). "Time-domain finite difference approach to the calculation of the frequency-dependent characteristics of microstrip discontinuities". IEEE Transactions on Microwave Theory and Techniques. 36 (12): 1775–1787. Bibcode:1988ITMTT..36.1775Z. doi:10.1109/22.17413.
- Zivanovic, S. S.; Yee, K. S.; Mei, K. K. (March 1991). "A subgridding method for the time-domain finite-difference method to solve Maxwell's equations". IEEE Transactions on Microwave Theory and Techniques. 39 (3): 471–479. Bibcode:1991ITMTT..39..471Z. doi:10.1109/22.75289.
- Mei, K.K.; Fang, J. (September 1992). "Superabsorption-a method to improve absorbing boundary conditions (electromagnetic waves)". IEEE Transactions on Antennas and Propagation. 40 (9): 1001–1010. Bibcode:1992ITAP...40.1001M. doi:10.1109/8.166524.
- Mei, K. K.; Pous, R.; Chen, Zhaoqing; Liu, Yao-Wu; Prouty, M.D. (March 1994). "Measured equation of invariance: a new concept in field computations". IEEE Transactions on Antennas and Propagation. 42 (3): 320–328. Bibcode:1994ITAP...42..320M. doi:10.1109/8.280717. hdl:2117/97625.
- Wang, Jun Hong; Mei, K. K. (December 2001). "Theory and analysis of leaky coaxial cables with periodic slots". IEEE Transactions on Antennas and Propagation. 49 (12): 1723–1732. Bibcode:2001ITAP...49.1723W. doi:10.1109/8.982452.
- Mei, K. K. (September 2003). "Theory of Maxwellian circuits". URSI Radio Science Bulletin. 2003 (306): 6–13.
