= Numerical Electromagnetics Code =

Computer program for antenna modeling

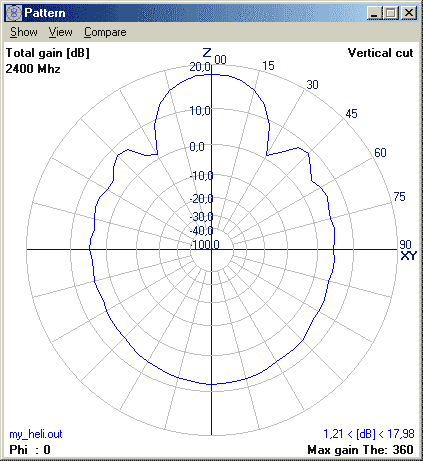
2.4 GHz helical antenna radiation pattern (NEC simulation)

The Numerical Electromagnetics Code, or NEC, is a popular antenna modeling computer program for wire and surface antennas. It was originally written in FORTRAN during the 1970s by Gerald Burke and Andrew Poggio of the Lawrence Livermore National Laboratory. The code was made publicly available in the early 1980s for general use and has subsequently been distributed for many computer platforms from mainframes to PCs.

NEC is widely used for modeling antenna designs, particularly for common designs like television and radio antennas, shortwave and ham radio, and similar examples. Examples of practically any common antenna type can be found in NEC format on the internet. While highly adaptable, NEC has its limits, and other systems are commonly used for very large or complex antennas or special cases like microwave antennas.

By far the most common version is NEC-2, the last to be released in fully public form. There is a wide and varied market of applications that embed the NEC-2 code within frameworks to simplify or automate common tasks. Later versions, NEC-3 and NEC-4, are available after signing a license agreement. These have not been nearly as popular. Versions using the same underlying methods but based on entirely new code are also available, including MININEC.

== History ==
NEC traces its history to an earlier program, BRACT, which was used to analyze antennas consisting of many thin wires in free space. It was useful for modeling certain common types of antennas used on aircraft or spacecraft or other examples where the ground was far enough away that it did not affect the signals. BRACT was developed in the early 1970s by MBAssociates for the US Air Force's Space and Missile Systems Center on the CDC 6600, one of the first supercomputers. MBAssociates, named after the founding partners of Bob Mainhardt and Art Biehl, are better known for the development of the Gyrojet rocket gun.

BRACT's success led to a second contract with MBAssociates, this time by the Naval Research Laboratory and USAF Rome Air Development Center, to adapt the BRACT code to consider the effect of the ground. This produced the Antenna Modeling Program, or AMP. AMP also moved from using punch cards for input and line printer output to using disk-based text files for input and output. AMP added support for disk-based files by emulating the original punch card system, writing out the data from a single card to 80-column line in a text file, with the file as a whole representing a deck of cards. A follow-up, AMP2, added calculations for extended surfaces like reflectors.

NEC is an advanced version of AMP2, with more options and features. It was written by programmers at Lawrence Livermore National Laboratory (LLNL) under contract to the Naval Ocean Systems Center and the Air Force Weapons Laboratory. The original NEC added a more accurate system for calculating currents along the wires, and at junctions between them, as well as an option that increased the accuracy when the wire was thick, with a low aspect ratio compared to its length. NEC-2 added two major features to the original NEC, a numerical Green's function for working with large planes, and an expansion of the ground-plane code to deal with partially lossy materials that are more realistic for antennas near the ground. With the release of NEC-2, the original became known as NEC-1.

Versions were introduced on the MS-DOS platform in the late 1980s, mostly using FORTRAN compilers capable of compiling the original code. Later versions converted the FORTRAN to the C programming language, either by hand or using automated tools. These programs were often limited by the platform's resources, and were often supplied in multiple versions to use more or less main memory as desired. Modern versions run on a wide variety of platforms. With the move to microcomputers, a profusion of slightly different file formats appeared, which was later described as "close to free format".

Modern antenna design programs usually have a separate graphical user interface (GUI) that allows the user to draw and edit the antenna. When the design is complete, the GUI converts it into the NEC-2 deck file, writes it to disk, and then passes that into a separate NEC-2 program. The GUI then parses NEC-2's output filed and graphically displays the results.

Development of the original NEC codes continued at LLNL, producing 1992's NEC-3 which added the ability to model elements buried in or projecting out of the ground, and NEC-4, which included a wide variety of updates. NEC-4 formalized what was already widely the case, taking input from a specified file, sending output to another file, and allowing comments to be added to any line using the ! character. NEC-4 also introduced a new licensing system, and is not available as open source.

One of the original authors of NEC-2, Gerald Burke, worked on the code even into retirement. This ultimately produced NEC-5, which uses new methods for some of the fundamental calculations that produces more accurate results in some edge cases where the older versions fail. NEC-5 was set to take over from the earlier versions, but when Burke died in 2012, development ended. According to reports, LLNL did not have the passwords for his development machine and lost all access to the source code. NEC-5 is now deprecated, and although it is still available for licensing, it only runs under Windows 10 or older.

== How it works ==
The code is based on the method of moments solution of the electric field integral equation (EFIE) for thin wires and the magnetic field integral equation (MFIE) for closed, conducting surfaces. It uses an iterative method to calculate the currents in a set of wires, and the fields that result.

The calculation starts by calculating the electrical field in space for a radio signal of a given frequency, normally traveling along the X axis in three-dimensional space. This field is uniform in Y and Z, but varies along the X axis; the signal's magnitude at any point along X is defined by the phase at that instant. Antennas work because the field changes over time as the wavefront moves past the antenna. This changing field induces current in conductors, the voltage being defined by the magnitude of the field at that instant. An antenna consists of extended but finite length conductors, so the pattern of the field results in different voltages at different points around the antenna. In antenna terms, each of the conductors making up the antenna is known as an element.

To calculate the net result, NEC breaks the antenna's elements into a number of sampled points, called segments. It uses simple calculations based on the diameter of the conductor and the wavelength of the signal to determine the induced voltage and currents at each of these segments. Depending on the arrangement of the wires, the induced currents in some segments will reinforce or resist the currents in others. NEC sums all of these to determine the net current in each of the conductors.

When alternating current flows in a conductor it radiates an electromagnetic wave (radio wave). In multi-element antennas, the fields due to currents in one element induce currents in the other elements. Antennas are self-interacting in this respect; the waves reradiated by the elements superimpose on the original radio signal being studied. NEC calculates the field resulting from these contributions, adds it to the original radio signal, and then runs the entire calculation again with this modified field. Because the reradiated signal is normally small compared to the original signal, it only produces a small change, or perturbation, in the resulting element currents. The program then repeats the calculation again with the new element currents, getting new radiation fields. This process is repeated until resulting values converge.

NEC uses a separate method to calculate the contribution of extended planes of material, like a wire mesh reflector. In this case, the plane is considered as a unit and the magnetic contribution is calculated directly and fed back into the calculation once the contributions from the individual wires are considered. Similar integral solutions are used to calculate the effects of the ground plane. Similarly, inductive and capacitive loads, insulated transmission wires above and buried in the ground and other common parts of an extended antenna system are also modeled using simpler numeric methods.

The calculations normally converge rapidly. The output is then sampled at a user-defined point, the load. In a real antenna, this is normally where the wire attaches for connection to the transmitter or receiver. The result is a value that indicates the energy delivered to the load on reception, or the amount of energy absorbed by the antenna during transmission.

NEC then repeats this entire series of calculations while changing the signal so it approaches the antenna from different angles along the X and Y axes, storing the results for each combination of angles. The results are then normalized to the strongest signal received (almost always at X and Y = 0, or "head on") to produce a 3D pattern illustrating the relative gain for every angle. The gain relative to an isotropic antenna (dBi), front-to-back ratio, standing wave ratio and the general reception pattern are all evident from these numbers. Programs often process this into more common forms like Smith charts.

The algorithm has no theoretical size limit and can be applied to very large arrays or for detailed modeling of very small antenna systems. The algorithm has proven reliable (likely to converge to a solution) and accurate (likely to produce results comparable to measured performance) at modeling thin-element structures like Yagi antennas and radiating towers. The NEC engine provides support for modeling patch antennas as well. It can be used for, but is not well suited to, slotted waveguide antennas, fractal antennas or similar designs in which the component conductive elements are not rod-like.

The method of moments algorithm has practical limitations as well; the number of calculations required to model a three-dimensional structure of N radiating elements is roughly proportional to the cube of N. Modeling an antenna with 100 wire segments requires 100^{3} = 1 million calculations. Increasing the number of elements by a factor of 10 requires 1000^{3} = 1 billion calculations, increasing the computing time by a factor of 1000, assuming the simulation completes at all given memory limitations and such. Consequently, there are other approaches such as geometric optics which are preferred for modeling large structures.

Most programs using NEC include features that run batches of NEC calculations to produce a composite output. A common example is to run the entire calculation suite for different input frequencies, and then plot samples on a single chart. One might use this to sample through the UHF television frequencies, for instance, producing a diagram that illustrates the gain across the band. Another common feature is an iterative solver that adjusts a given parameter between runs, say the spacing between elements, in order to maximize performance. These operations are highly independent and can be trivially paralleled on modern machines.

== Example ==
The NEC input file is a sequence of lines; the input file is known as a "deck" (from "card deck', referring to the original punch card formats) and uses a .deck or .nec file extension. Each line of text, or "card", starts with one of several dozen identifiers that indicate how the line should be interpreted. One of the most common identifiers found in NEC codes is GW, which defines a single wire (element) in the antenna. Its definition is:

GW ITG NS XW1 YW1 ZW1 XW2 YW2 ZW2 RAD

The string literal GW identifies this as a line describing straight-wire geometry. The parameter ITG, short for "integer tag", is a user-provided number used to identify ("tag") this element. The NS parameter defines the number of segments the wire should be divided into during the calculation; using more segments breaks the wire into smaller parts and may produce more accurate results at the cost of increased calculation time. The next six parameters are real numbers that define the X, Y and Z locations of the wire's two endpoints. Finally, the RAD parameter is the radius of the wire. If this is set to zero, then the next line must be a GC line that includes additional information to define tapering rods.

The following example of a complete input deck models a log-periodic antenna, like those used for VHF television reception:

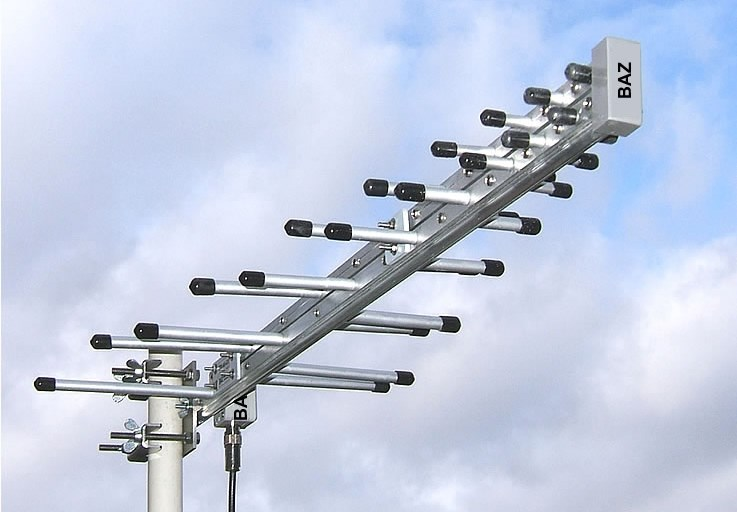
This 16-element log-periodic design is similar to the 12-element one being modeled in the example deck.

CM TESTEX5
CM 12 ELEMENT LOG PERIODIC ANTENNA IN FREE SPACE
CM 78 SEGMENTS. SIGMA=O/L RECEIVING AND TRANS. PATTERNS.
CM DIPOLE LENGTH TO DIAMETER RATIO=150.
CE TAU=0.93. SIGMA=0.70. BOOM IMPEDANCE=50. OHMS.
GW 1 5 0.0000 -1.0000 0.0000000 0.00000 1.0000 0.000 .00667
GW 2 5 -.7527 -1.0753 0. -.7527 1.0753 0. .00717
GW 3 5 -1.562 -1.1562 0. -1.562 1.1562 0. .00771
GW 4 5 -2.4323 -1.2432 0. -2.4323 1.2432 0. .00829
GW 5 5 -3.368 -1.3368 0. -3.368 1.3368 0. .00891
GW 6 7 -4.3742 -1.4374 0. -4.3742 1.4374 0. .00958
GW 7 7 -5.4562 -1.5456 0. -5.4562 1.5456 0. .0103
GW 8 7 -6.6195 -1.6619 0. -6.6195 1.6619 0. .01108
GW 9 7 -7.8705 -1.787 0. -7.8705 1.787 0. .01191
GW 10 7 -9.2156 -1.9215 0. -9.2156 1.9215 0. .01281
GW 11 9 -10.6619 -2.0662 0. -10.6619 2.0662 0. .01377
GW 12 9 -12.2171 -2.2217 0. -12.2171 2.2217 0. .01481
GE
FR 0 0 0 0 46.29 0.
TL 1 3 2 3 -50.
TL 2 3 3 3 -50.
TL 3 3 4 3 -50.
TL 4 3 5 3 -50.
TL 5 3 6 4 -50.
TL 6 4 7 4 -50.
TL 7 4 8 4 -50.
TL 8 4 9 4 -50.
TL 9 4 10 4 -50.
TL 10 4 11 5 -50.
TL 11 5 12 5 -50. ,0.,0.,0.,.02
EX 0 1 3 10 1 
RP 0 37 1 1110 90. 0. -5. 0.
EN

The example starts with several CM (comment) lines followed by the last comment on a CE (comment end) line. The CE must be followed by geometry lines, whose commands generally start with the letter G.

In this case, the geometry section consists of twelve GW elements making up the antenna. Each element is longer than the last, and to maintain accuracy, the later elements are divided into more segments. All measurements in NEC use metres, so the first element is 2 metres wide, running from -1 to 1. The GE line indicates the end of the geometry section. At this point, NEC scans the geometry for overlapping endpoints, which it then connects together to make a single longer conductor. The GE line also has a single input that indicates whether a ground plane is present; in this example, it is not specified, so the antenna is located above a "standard ground".

The FR line then sets the test frequency to 46.29 MHz. FR lines can optionally define the number and magnitude of the frequency steps if the system is being used to analyze the performance across a range of frequencies, but this is not being used in this case. The TL lines (transmission line) connect the various elements together. These can be seen on most log-periodic designs in the form of two thin rods running down the boom between the main antenna elements, although some designs use the boom itself, or hide the wires within the boom. The EX (excitation) line indicates the location of the energy supplied to the design, in this case 1 Volt of electric potential difference is applied at the middle of the wire tagged 1, while the RP (radiation pattern) sets up some specifics of the signal.

Finally the EN line (end of input) indicates the deck is complete, at which point the NEC code starts the simulation and generates reports. The reports start by reprinting much of the input, which allows the user to check for errors. It then includes lengthy sections showing how the system broke the antenna down into segments. Finally, it begins to list calculated values, in tabular format. A small sample of the output from the sample above includes:

                                  - - - RADIATION PATTERNS - - -

  - - ANGLES - -    - DIRECTIVE GAINS -  - - POLARIZATION - -   - - E(THETA) - -   - - - E(PHI) - - -
  THETA     PHI     VERT. HOR.   TOTAL   AXIAL   TILT   SENSE   MAGNITUDE  PHASE   MAGNITUDE   PHASE
 DEGREES  DEGREES   DB     DB    DB      RATIO   DEG.            VOLTS/M  DEGREES    VOLTS/M   DEGREES
  90.00     .00   -999.99  9.75  9.75   .00000  90.00  LINEAR  0.00000E+00    .00  2.46922E+00  -66.00
  85.00     .00   -999.99  9.70  9.70   .00000  90.00  LINEAR  0.00000E+00    .00  2.45352E+00  -65.20
[many lines removed]
  30.00     .00   -999.99  2.10  2.10   .00000  90.00  LINEAR  0.00000E+00    .00  1.02313E+00   38.02
  25.00     .00   -999.99  -.14  -.14   .00000  90.00  LINEAR  0.00000E+00    .00  7.90310E-01   59.26
[more lines removed]

The output indicates that the antenna has a maximum gain of 9.75 dBi, a little over three times the gain of an isotropic antenna. However, as the signal moves even five degrees to the side, this has dropped to 9.5. When you reach 75 degrees off the front, the antenna begins to have negative gain. This indicates that this antenna is fairly directional, and one would expect it to have a high front-to-back ratio.

== NEC versions ==
=== BRACT ===
BRACT was a pure method of moments implementation, suitable for use on antennas consisting of uniform diameter conductors arranged in free space and connected to each other at their ends (if at all). It did not model the contributions of the ground (or water) and was primarily useful for aircraft and spacecraft type applications.

=== AMP ===
AMP modified BRACT by adding a system for calculating the effects of ground planes.

=== AMP2 ===
AMP2 added the ability to model extended closed surfaces.

=== NEC-1 ===
The original NEC, later known as NEC-1 after NEC-2 was introduced, was a modification of the earlier AMP2, adding a more accurate current expansion along wires and at multiple wire junctions, and an option in the wire modeling for far greater accuracy on thick wires. A new model for a voltage source was added and several other modifications made for increased accuracy.

=== NEC-2 ===
NEC-2 is the highest version of the code within the public domain without a license. It cannot model buried radials or ground stakes.

=== NEC-3 ===
NEC-3 modified NEC-2 to include a Sommerfeld model to properly model wires buried in or close to the ground.

=== NEC-4 ===
NEC-4 modified NEC-3 to better model very small antennas, like those on cell phones and WiFi routers. The most recent version, 4.2, includes a better version of the Sommerfeld model used in NEC-3 for in- and near-ground wires, added current sources instead of just voltage sources as in earlier models, and used a new memory management system that allows arbitrarily large designs.

NEC-4 remains the property of the Lawrence Livermore National Laboratory and the University of California. NEC-4 requires a license.

=== NEC-5 ===
NEC-5 solves the Electric-field integral equation for wires and surfaces using the newer mixed potential method developed by Rao, Wilton and Glisson. NEC-5 remains the property of the Lawrence Livermore National Laboratory and the University of California. NEC-5 requires a license.

The sole creator and maintainer of the NEC-5 code, Gerald Burke, passed away in 2021 shortly after releasing the first version. Although the program continues to be offered for licensing, it is no longer actively maintained and is no longer supported, although some major bugs were fixed by end-users.

=== MININEC ===
MININEC is an independent implementation of the concepts in NEC. It uses the same method of moments algorithm to calculate the outcomes, but using entirely original code. The first versions were written in 1980 in BASIC for 32 kB Apple II computers, and after following some advice from Professor Wilton at the University of Mississippi, the first public release was made in 1982 for 64 kB machines. An improved version, MININEC2, was released in 1984, followed by a port to the IBM PC as MININEC3 in 1986. Like the original NEC, MININEC now runs on many platforms, although its popularity has fallen with the more widespread availability of the original NEC codes in C form.

MININEC suffers from some known flaws compared to NEC, the best known being that resonant frequencies may be slightly in error. However, MININEC handles different wire diameters better than NEC-2 and probably NEC-4; this includes different diameter parallel wires, different diameter wires joined at an angle and tapered diameter antenna elements. Placing sources at an intersection of two wires is a problem for NEC-2 but not MININEC. MININEC converges more slowly (requires more segments) when wires join at an angle, when wire segments of significantly different length are adjacent, and has a weaker ground model.
