= Frederic Richard Morgenthaler =

American electrical engineer and academic

Frederic R. Morgenthaler
- Born: Frederic Richard Morgenthaler; March 12, 1933; Shaker Heights, Ohio, U.S.
- Died: June 21, 2015 (aged 82); Wellesley, Massachusetts, U.S.
- Education: Massachusetts Institute of Technology
- Spouse: Barbara Pullen Morgenthaler
- Scientific career
- Fields: Electrical engineering
- Workplaces: Massachusetts Institute of Technology; Air Force Cambridge Research Center
- Thesis: On the general theory of microwave interactions with ellipsoidal ferrimagnetic insulators (1960)
- Doctoral advisor: Lan Jen Chu

Frederic Richard Morgenthaler (March 12, 1933 — June 21, 2015) was an American electrical engineer and academician, who was a Professor Emeritus at the Department of Electrical Engineering and Computer Science at Massachusetts Institute of Technology. During his tenure, he was the director of Microwave and Quantum Magnetics Group at Research Laboratory of Electronics.

== Biography ==
Frederic Richard Morgenthaler was born on March 12, 1933 in Shaker Heights, Ohio. He received bachelor's and master's degree in electrical engineering from Massachusetts Institute of Technology in 1956. Working on the microwave ferrite devices during his service as lieutenant at the United States Air Force from 1957 to 1959, he has subsequently completed his PhD studies on this topic under Lan Jen Chu at MIT in 1960. He has joined the faculty of MIT at the same year.

During his tenure at MIT, Morgenthaler led the Microwave and Quantum Magnetics Group and was a member of the Research Laboratory of Electronics, the Center for Material Sciences and Engineering and Harvard-MIT Division of Health Sciences and Technology. He held the Cecil H. Green Professorship from 1984 to 1986. Morgenthaler's research has focused on microwave magnetics and the electrodynamics. His 1958 work on velocity modulation of electromagnetic media has pioneered the field of time-varying photonics and metamaterials. Being the author of the textbook The Power and Beauty of Electromagnetic Fields (2011), he has taught undergraduate and graduate courses in electromagnetic theory, antennas, circuit theory, and semiconductor electronics. He was a fellow member of the IEEE.

Retiring in 1996, Morgenthaler died on June 21, 2015 in Wellesley, Massachusetts. He was survived by his wife Barbara Pullen Morgenthaler, his two daughters and four grandchildren.

== Selected publications ==
=== Textbooks ===
- The Power and Beauty of Electromagnetic Fields (2011)

=== Journal articles ===
- Morgenthaler, F. R. (1958). "Velocity modulation of electromagnetic waves". IRE Transactions on Microwave Theory and Techniques. 6 (2): 167–172. Bibcode:1958ITMTT...6..167M. doi:10.1109/TMTT.1958.1124533. hdl:1721.1/152080.
- Morgenthaler, F. R. (1960). "Survey of ferromagnetic resonance in small ferrimagnetic ellipsoids". Journal of Applied Physics. 31 (5): S95–S97. Bibcode:1960JAP....31S..95M. doi:10.1063/1.1984617.
- Matthews, H.; Morgenthaler, F. R. (1964). "Phonon-pumped spin-wave instabilities". Physical Review Letters. 13 (21): 614–616. Bibcode:1964PhRvL..13..614M. doi:10.1103/PhysRevLett.13.614.
- Rezende, S. M.; Morgenthaler, F. R. (1969). "Magnetoelastic waves in time-varying magnetic fields. I. Theory". Journal of Applied Physics. 40 (2): 524–536. Bibcode:1969JAP....40..524R. doi:10.1063/1.1657433.
- Morgenthaler, F. (1977). "Magnetostatic waves bound to a DC field gradient". IEEE Transactions on Magnetics. 13 (5): 1252–1254. Bibcode:1977ITM....13.1252M. doi:10.1109/TMAG.1977.1059532.
- Rappaport, C. M.; Morgenthaler, F. R. (1987). "Optimal source distribution for hyperthermia at the center of a sphere of muscle tissue". IEEE Transactions on Microwave Theory and Techniques. 35 (12): 1322–1327. Bibcode:1987ITMTT..35.1322R. doi:10.1109/TMTT.1987.1133855.
- How, H.; O'Handley, R. C.; Morgenthaler, F. R. (1989). "Soliton theory for realistic magnetic domain-wall dynamics". Physical Review B. 40 (7): 4808–4817. Bibcode:1989PhRvB..40.4808H. doi:10.1103/PhysRevB.40.4808. PMID 9992476.
