= Chu–Harrington limit =

Lower bound on the quality factor of small radio antennae

In electrical engineering and telecommunications, the Chu–Harrington limit or Chu limit sets a lower limit on the Q factor for a small radio antenna. The theorem was developed in several papers between 1948 and 1960 by Lan Jen Chu, Harold Wheeler, and later by Roger F. Harrington. The definition of a small antenna is one that can fit inside a sphere whose diameter is $\tfrac{1}{\pi}\lambda$ (radius $\tfrac{\lambda}{2 \pi}$) – a little smaller than 1/3 wavelength in its widest dimension. For a small antenna the Q is proportional to the reciprocal of the volume of a sphere that encloses it. In practice this means that there is a limit to the bandwidth of data that can be sent to and received from small antennas such as are used in mobile phones.

More specifically, Chu established the limit on Q for a lossless antenna as $Q \geq \frac{1}{k^3 a^3} + \frac{1}{k a}$ for a linear polarized antenna, where $a$ is the radius of the smallest sphere containing the antenna and its current distribution and $k = \frac{2 \pi}{\lambda}$ is the wavenumber. A circular polarized antenna can be half the size (an extension of the theory of Chu by Harrington).

As antennas are made smaller, the bandwidth shrinks and radiation resistance becomes smaller compared to loss resistances that may be present, thus reducing the radiation efficiency. For users this decreases the bitrate, limits range, and shortens battery life.

== Method of proof ==
Chu expressed the electromagnetic field in terms of evanescent modes with a real component and non-propagating modes. The fields were expressed as a spherical harmonic series with the components being Legendre functions and spherical Bessel functions. The impedance could be expressed as a series of a ratio of a derivative of a Hankel function to other Hankel functions.

An equivalent circuit is a ladder line with the shunts (rungs) being inductors and the capacitors running in series (railings). The number of elements used in the mathematical series matches the number of capacitor-inductor pairs in the equivalent circuit.

== Practical implications ==
In practice an electrically small antenna is one that is operated at a frequency below its natural resonance. Small antennas are characterised by low radiation resistance and relatively high reactance, so that a tuning component must be added in series with the antenna to cancel its reactance and assist matching to the circuit to which it is connected. The addition of this extra component creates a tuned circuit, with a Q-factor that potentially limits the instantaneous bandwidth available for signals passing through the antenna. This is a fundamental limit that sets a minimum size for any antenna used at a given frequency and with a given required bandwidth.

The Chu limit gives the minimum Q, and by implication the maximum bandwidth, for an antenna of a given size on the assumption that it is lossless. However, any antenna can be made to show a larger bandwidth than suggested by the Chu limit if there is additional resistance present to reduce the Q, and this has led to claims for antennas that have breached the limit, but none has so far been substantiated.

== Designs close to the limit ==
- The Goubau antenna from 1976 has a size ratio of 1 and bandwidth of 80%. Q is 1.5 times the limit.
- The Foltz drawing pin like antenna from 1998 size 0.62 and 22% bandwidth.
- The Rogers cone from 2001 is size 0.65 and right on the limit.
- Lina and Choo planar spirals in size ratios range from 0.2 to 0.5
- The fractal Koch curve antenna approaches the limit.
- A meander line antenna optimizes the size for narrower bandwidths of the order 10%.
- Underhill and Harper claim that an electrically small loop antenna can violate the Chu limit
