= Multilevel fast multipole method =

Computational mathematics

The multilevel fast multipole method (MLFMM) is used along with method of moments (MoM) a numerical computational method of solving linear partial differential equations which have been formulated as integral equations of large objects almost faster without loss in accuracy. This method is an alternative formulation of the technology behind the MoM and is applicable to much larger structures like radar cross-section (RCS) analysis, antenna integration on large structures, reflector antenna design, finite size antenna arrays, etc., making full-wave current-based solutions of such structures a possibility.

== Method ==
The MLFMM is based on the Method of Moments (MoM), but reduces the memory complexity from $\mathcal O(N^2)$ to $\mathcal O(N\log N)$, and the solving complexity from $\mathcal O (N^3)$ to $\mathcal O(N_\textrm{iter} N \log N)$, where $N$ represents the number of unknowns and $N_\textrm{iter}$ the number of iterations in the solver. This method subdivides the Boundary Element mesh into different clusters and if two clusters are in each other's far field, all calculations that would have to be made for every pair of nodes can be reduced to the midpoints of the clusters with almost no loss of accuracy. For clusters not in the far field, the traditional BEM has to be applied. That is MLFMM introduces different levels of clustering (clusters made out of smaller clusters) to additionally enhance computation speed.
