= Almudena Suarez =

Spanish electrical engineer

Almudena Suárez
- Born: Santander, Cantabria
- Education: University of Cantabria (Ph.D.); University of Limoges (Ph.D)
- Awards: IEEE Fellow (2012) "Juan Mª Parés" Research Award (2022) IEEE MTT-S Distinguished Educator Award (2025)
- Scientific career
- Fields: Microwave Engineering; Electrical Engineering; Computer-Aided Design; Nonlinear Analysis; Stability Analysis; Phase Noise Analysis

Almudena Suárez is a Spanish academic known for her contributions to the field of electrical engineering. She currently holds the position of Full Professor at the University of Cantabria (Spanish: Universidad de Cantabria) in Santander, Cantabria, Spain. Since 2012, she is an IEEE Fellow for her work on stability concepts to the computer-aided design of nonlinear microwave circuits.

== Education, career and research ==
She obtained a Ph.D. in Science from the University of Cantabria in 1992 and a Ph.D. in Electronics from the University of Limoges, France, in 1993, with the distinction "Très honorable avec félicitations du jury".

Prof. Suárez was elevated to the grade of Fellow of the Institute of Electrical and Electronics Engineers (IEEE) in 2012. This elevation to the Fellow grade was bestowed upon her in acknowledgment of her contributions to the advancement of stability concepts in the computer-aided design of nonlinear microwave circuits.

Suárez was an IEEE Distinguished Microwave Lecturer of the IEEE Microwave Theory and Techniques Society (IEEE MTT-S) during 2006-2008. In 2004–2005 she was an invited visitor professor in California Institute of Technology financed by Lee Center for Advanced Networking.

From October 2022 to December 2025, she served as Editor-in-Chief of the journal ''IEEE Transactions on Microwave Theory and Techniques''.

She was the Editor-in-Chief of the International Journal of Microwave and Wireless Technologies from Cambridge University Press from 2013 to 2018. She was a member of the Board of Directors of European Microwave Association (EuMA) from 2012 to 2020, and Chair of the Publications Committee from 2021 to 2023.

In 2025, Suárez received the IEEE MTT-S Distinguished Educator Award for outstanding achievements as an educator, mentor and role model in the field of microwave engineering."2025 IEEE MTT-S Distinguished Educator Award" (PDF). IEEE Microwave Theory and Technology Society.

== Books ==
- A. Suárez, Analysis and Design of Autonomous Microwave Circuits, John Wiley & Sons, Inc., Hoboken, New Jersey, 2009.
- A. Suárez, R. Quéré, Stability Analysis of Nonlinear Microwave Circuits, Artech-House Publishers, Boston, 2003.
