= HOBBIES (electromagnetic solver) =

HOBBIES is a general purpose electromagnetic solver for various applications. The name is an acronym for Higher Order Basis Based Integral Equation Solver.

The software is based on the Method of Moments (MoM), and it employs higher order polynomials as the basis functions for the frequency domain integral equation solver.

The higher-order basis functions can significantly reduce the number of unknowns compared with the traditional piece-wise basis functions, e.g., Rao-Wiltion-Glisson triangular patch basis functions (RWGs).

HOBBIES can be used to solve various types of electromagnetic field problems including antenna design, antenna placement, scattering analysis, EMI/EMC analysis, etc.

The software pioneered the commercial implementation of parallel computation for solving extremely electrically large problems using modest computational resources.
