= Hermann A. Haus =

Slovene-American physicist and academic

Hermann Anton Haus
- Born: August 8, 1925; Ljubljana, Kingdom of Yugoslavia
- Died: May 21, 2003 (aged 77); Lexington, Massachusetts
- Education: Union College (BS) - 1949; Rensselaer Polytechnic Institute (MS) - 1951; MIT (ScD) - 1954
- Known for: Optical communications
- Awards: IEEE James H. Mulligan, Jr. Education Medal (1991); Frederic Ives Medal (1994) National Medal of Science (1995)
- Scientific career
- Fields: Optical communications, Electrical Engineering, Applied Physics
- Workplaces: MIT
- Thesis: Propagation of noise and signals along electron beams at microwave frequencies (1954)
- Doctoral advisor: Lan Jen Chu

Hermann Anton Haus (August 8, 1925 – May 21, 2003) was an Austrian-American physicist, electrical engineer, and Institute Professor at the Massachusetts Institute of Technology. Haus' research and teaching ranged from fundamental investigations of quantum uncertainty as manifested in optical communications to the practical generation of ultra-short optical pulses. In 1994, the Optical Society of America recognized Dr. Haus' contributions with its Frederic Ives Medal, the society's highest award. He also received OSA's Charles Hard Townes Medal in 1987, and was a Fellow of the society. Haus authored or co-authored eight books (see section below), published nearly 300 articles, and presented his work at virtually every major conference and symposium on laser and quantum electronics and quantum optics around the world. He was awarded the National Medal of Science in 1995 and was adopted into RPI's Alumni Hall of Fame in 2007.

He was a grandson of the Austrian admiral Anton Haus. His father, Otto Maximilian Haus, was a leading Slovenian doctor who investigated tuberculosis. The tomb of his great-grandmother Marija Haus (Walter) is still in Bubnjarci, Croatia.

== Books authored or co-authored by Prof. Haus ==
- H. A. Haus and R. B. Adler, Circuit Theory of Linear Noisy Networks (The MIT Press, 1959).
- H. A. Haus, Noise in Electron Devices (The MIT Press, 1959)
- H. A. Haus and J. P. Penhune, Case Studies in Electromagnetism: Problems with Solutions (Wiley, 1960).
- P. Penfield and H. A. Haus, Electrodynamics of Moving Media (The MIT Press, 1967).
- H. A. Haus, Waves and Fields in Optoelectronics (Prentice Hall, Incorporated, 1984).
- H. A. Haus and J. R. Melcher, Electromagnetic Fields and Energy (Prentice Hall, 1989).
- H. A. Haus, Electromagnetic Noise and Quantum Optical Measurements (Springer Science & Business Media, 2000).
- C. Manolatou and H. A. Haus, Passive Components for Dense Optical Integration (Springer Science & Business Media, 2002).

== See also ==
- List of textbooks in electromagnetism
