= Julius Adams Stratton =

American university president (1901–1994)

11th President of Massachusetts Institute of Technology
- In office 1959–1966
- Preceded by: James Rhyne Killian
- Succeeded by: Howard Wesley Johnson

1st Chancellor of Massachusetts Institute of Technology
- In office 1956–1959
- President: James Rhyne Killian
- Succeeded by: Paul E. Gray

Personal details
- Born: May 18, 1901 Seattle, Washington, U.S.
- Died: June 22, 1994 (aged 93) Boston, Massachusetts, U.S.
- Scientific career
- Education: Massachusetts Institute of Technology; Eidgenössische Technische Hochschule Zürich
- Known for: Stratton-Chu integral equation
- Awards: Medal for Merit (1946); Fellow of the APS (1936); IEEE Medal of Honor (1957); Faraday Medal (1961)
- Fields: Electrical engineering
- Workplaces: Massachusetts Institute of Technology
- Thesis: Streuungskoeffizient von Wasserstoff nach der Wellenmechanik (1928)
- Doctoral advisors: Paul Scherrer; Hermann Weyl
- Doctoral students: Lan Jen Chu

Julius Adams Stratton (May 18, 1901 – June 22, 1994) was an American electrical engineer, physicist, and university administrator known for his contributions in applied electromagnetism. He attended the University of Washington for one year, where he was admitted to the Zeta Psi fraternity, then transferred to the Massachusetts Institute of Technology (MIT), from which he graduated with a bachelor's degree in 1923 and a master's degree in 1926 both in electrical engineering. He then followed graduate studies in Europe and the Technische Hochschule of Zürich (ETH Zurich), Switzerland, awarded him the degree of Doctor of Science in 1928.

== Professional biography ==
Stratton was appointed Assistant Professor in Electrical Engineering Department at MIT after his PhD. In 1930 his appointment was transferred to the Physics Department. He was promoted to Professor in 1941. He was one of the first staff members of the MIT Radiation Laboratory who joined the Laboratory in 1940. In 1946 he was appointed founding director of the Research Laboratory of Electronics which continued the interdisciplinary model of research started at the Radiation Laboratory.

He published the classic book Electromagnetic Theory as part of the McGraw Hill series in Pure and Applied Physics in 1941. Stratton's book was one of the most influential electromagnetic textbooks which had formed an integral part of the graduate electromagnetic educations of both physics and electrical engineering communities since its publication. John David Jackson described Stratton's book as his bible and said that he used Stratton's book to learn advanced electromagnetism. Stratton's book was also described by Julian Schwinger as one of the essential electromagnetic textbooks. In 2007 Stratton's book had been reissued by the IEEE as one of its classic reissues in the collection of The IEEE Press Series on Electromagnetic Wave Theory. Stratton's book was one of the most requested classic electromagnetic textbook for reissuing in electrical engineering community. According to Donald G. Dudley then series editor of The IEEE Press Series on Electromagnetic Wave Theory, over twelve years before reissued publication of textbook in 2007, he had received many requests worldwide to reissue Stratton's book.

Stratton was elected to the American Academy of Arts and Sciences in 1946. In the same year he was awarded the Medal for Merit for his services. He was elected to the United States National Academy of Sciences in 1950 and the American Philosophical Society in 1956. He served as the president of MIT between 1959 and 1966, after serving the university in several lesser posts, notably appointments to provost in 1949, vice president in 1951, and chancellor in 1956.

In the 1955–1965 he served as member of Board of Trustees, RAND Corporation. He also served as the chairman of the Ford Foundation between 1964 and 1971.

In 1967, Stratton was seconded to chair a Congressionally established "Commission on Marine Sciences, Engineering and Resources" whose work culminated in a report, "Our Nation and the Sea", published in 1969, that had a major influence on ocean sciences and management in the United States and abroad. The commission itself became commonly referred to as the Stratton Commission.

Stratton was also a founding member of the National Academy of Engineering.

Stratton collected his speeches in a 1966 book titled Science and the Educated Man: Selected Speeches of Julius A. Stratton (Cambridge, Mass.: MIT Press, 1966), with a foreword by the historian of technology Elting E. Morison who had been on the faculty of MIT as a professor of humanities in the Sloan School of Industrial Management from 1946 to 1966.

MIT's Julius Adams Stratton Student Center at 84 Massachusetts Avenue is named in his honor.

== Publications ==
=== Books ===
- Stratton JA, Electromagnetic Theory, Wiley-IEEE, 2007. (Note: Pages 464–470 of the book were written in collaboration with Lan Jen Chu.)
- Stratton JA, Morse PM, Chu LJ, Hunter RA, Elliptic Cylinder and Spheroidal Wave Functions: Including Tables of Separation Constants and Coefficients, Wiley-MIT, 1941.
- Stratton JA, Morse PM, Chu LJ, Little JDC, Corbató FJ, Spheroidal Wave Functions: Including Tables of Separation Constants and Coefficients, MIT, 1956.

=== Articles ===
- Stratton, J. A. (1926). "A High Frequency Bridge". Journal of the Optical Society of America. 13 (4): 471. Bibcode:1926JOSA...13..471S. doi:10.1364/JOSA.13.000471.
- ——; Houghton, H. G. (1931). "A Theoretical Investigation of the Transmission of Light through Fog". Physical Review. 38 (1): 159–165. Bibcode:1931PhRv...38..159S. doi:10.1103/PhysRev.38.159.
- —— (1935). "Spheroidal Functions". Proceedings of the National Academy of Sciences. 21 (1): 51–56. Bibcode:1935PNAS...21...51S. doi:10.1073/pnas.21.1.51. PMC 1076527. PMID 16577657.
- —— (1935). "Spheroidal Functions of the Second Kind". Proceedings of the National Academy of Sciences. 21 (6): 316–321. Bibcode:1935PNAS...21..316S. doi:10.1073/pnas.21.6.316. PMC 1076595. PMID 16587971.
- ——; Chu, L. J. (1939). "Diffraction Theory of Electromagnetic Waves". Physical Review. 56 (1): 99–107. Bibcode:1939PhRv...56...99S. doi:10.1103/PhysRev.56.99.
- ——; Chu, L. J. (1941). "Steady-State Solutions of Electromagnetic Field Problems. I. Forced Oscillations of a Cylindrical Conductor". Journal of Applied Physics. 12 (3): 230–235. Bibcode:1941JAP....12..230S. doi:10.1063/1.1712899.
- ——; Chu, L. J. (1941). "Steady-State Solutions of Electromagnetic Field Problems. II. Forced Oscillations of a Conducting Sphere". Journal of Applied Physics. 12 (3): 236–240. Bibcode:1941JAP....12..236S. doi:10.1063/1.1712900.
- —— (1956). "Science and the educated man". Physics Today. 9 (4): 17–20. Bibcode:1956PhT.....9d..17S. doi:10.1063/1.3059932.
- —— (1965). "Advice to a New Academy". Science. 149 (3689): 1206–1208. Bibcode:1965Sci...149.1206S. doi:10.1126/science.149.3689.1206. PMID 17747445.

=== Other books ===
- Stratton JA, Science and the Educated Man: Selected Speeches of Julius A. Stratton, MIT, 1966.
- Stratton JA, Mannix LH, Mind and Hand: The Birth of MIT, MIT, 2005.

== See also ==
- List of textbooks in electromagnetism

== Notes ==
Academic offices
| New office | 1st Chancellor of the Massachusetts Institute of Technology; 1956–1959 | Vacant Title next held by Paul E. Gray |
| Preceded by James Rhyne Killian | 11h President of the Massachusetts Institute of Technology; 1959–1966 | Succeeded by Howard Wesley Johnson |
