= Analytical regularization =

In physics and applied mathematics, analytical regularization is a technique used to convert boundary value problems which can be written as Fredholm integral equations of the first kind involving singular operators into equivalent Fredholm integral equations of the second kind. The latter may be easier to solve analytically and can be studied with discretization schemes like the finite element method or the finite difference method because they are pointwise convergent. In computational electromagnetics, it is known as the method of analytical regularization. It was first used in mathematics during the development of operator theory before acquiring a name.

== Method ==
Analytical regularization proceeds as follows. First, the boundary value problem is formulated as an integral equation. Written as an operator equation, this will take the form

$$G X= Y$$

with $Y$ representing boundary conditions and inhomogeneities, $X$ representing the field of interest, and $G$ the integral operator describing how Y is given from X based on the physics of the problem. Next, $G$ is split into $G_1 + G_2$, where $G_1$ is invertible and contains all the singularities of $G$ and $G_2$ is regular. After splitting the operator and multiplying by the inverse of $G_1$, the equation becomes

$$X + G_1^{-1}  G_2 X=  G_1^{-1} Y$$

or

$$X + A X =  B$$

which is now a Fredholm equation of the second type because by construction $A$ is compact on the Hilbert space of which $B$ is a member.

In general, several choices for $\mathbf{G}_1$ will be possible for each problem.

== See also ==
- Method of moments (electromagnetics)
