= Characteristic mode analysis =

Characteristic modes (CM) form a set of functions which, under specific boundary conditions, diagonalizes operator relating field and induced sources. Under certain conditions, the set of the CM is unique and complete (at least theoretically) and thereby capable of describing the behavior of a studied object in full.

This article deals with characteristic mode decomposition in electromagnetics, a domain in which the CM theory has originally been proposed.

== Background ==
CM decomposition was originally introduced as set of modes diagonalizing a scattering matrix. The theory has, subsequently, been generalized by Harrington and Mautz for antennas. Harrington, Mautz and their students also successively developed several other extensions of the theory. Even though some precursors were published back in the late 1940s, the full potential of CM has remained unrecognized for an additional 40 years. The capabilities of CM were revisited in 2007 and, since then, interest in CM has dramatically increased. The subsequent boom of CM theory is reflected by the number of prominent publications and applications.

== Definition ==
For simplicity, only the original form of the CM – formulated for perfectly electrically conducting (PEC) bodies in free space — will be treated in this article. The electromagnetic quantities will solely be represented as Fourier's images in frequency domain. Lorenz's gauge is used.

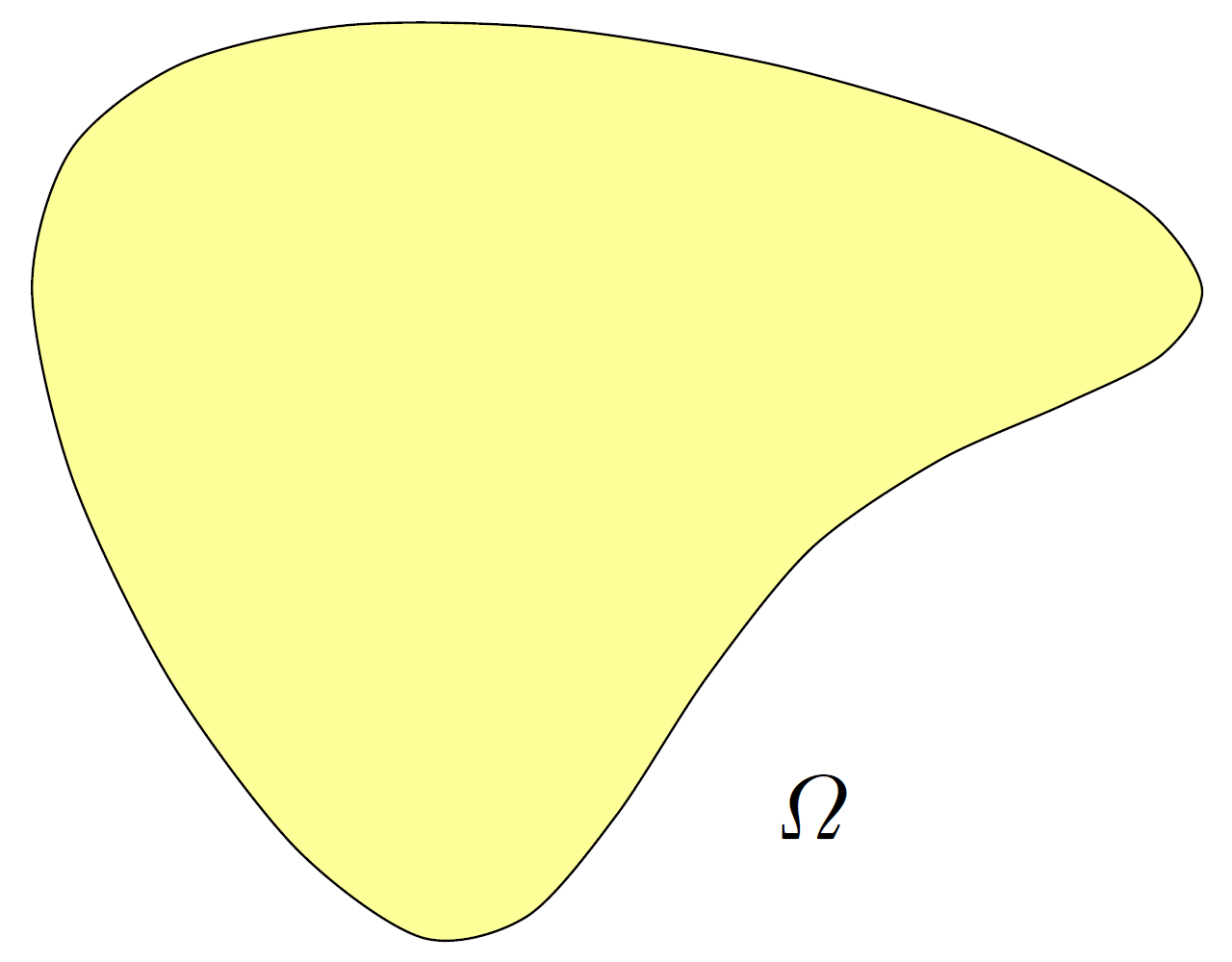
Example of a scatterer $\Omega$ composed of a perfect electric conductor.

The scattering of an electromagnetic wave on a PEC body is represented via a boundary condition on the PEC body, namely

$$\boldsymbol{\hat{n}} \times \boldsymbol{E}^\mathrm{i} = -\boldsymbol{\hat{n}} \times \boldsymbol{E}^\mathrm{s},$$

with $\boldsymbol{\hat{n}}$ representing unitary normal to the PEC surface, $\boldsymbol{E}^\mathrm{i}$ representing incident electric field intensity, and $\boldsymbol{E}^\mathrm{s}$ representing scattered electric field intensity defined as

$$\boldsymbol{E}^\mathrm{s} = -\mathrm{j}\omega\boldsymbol{A} - \nabla\varphi,$$

with $\mathrm{j}$ being imaginary unit, $\omega$ being angular frequency, $\boldsymbol{A}$ being vector potential

$$\boldsymbol{A} \left(\boldsymbol{r}\right) = \mu_0 \int\limits_\Omega \boldsymbol{J} \left(\boldsymbol{r}'\right) G \left(\boldsymbol{r}, \boldsymbol{r}'\right) \, \mathrm{d}S,$$

$\mu_0$ being vacuum permeability, $\varphi$ being scalar potential

$$\varphi \left(\boldsymbol{r}\right) = - \frac{1}{\mathrm{j}\omega\epsilon_0} \int\limits_\Omega \nabla\cdot\boldsymbol{J} \left(\boldsymbol{r}'\right) G \left(\boldsymbol{r}, \boldsymbol{r}'\right) \, \mathrm{d}S,$$

$\epsilon_0$ being vacuum permittivity, $G \left(\boldsymbol{r},\boldsymbol{r}'\right)$ being scalar Green's function

$$G \left(\boldsymbol{r},\boldsymbol{r}'\right) = \frac{\mathrm{e}^{-\mathrm{j}k\left|\boldsymbol{r} - \boldsymbol{r}'\right|}}{4\pi \left|\boldsymbol{r} - \boldsymbol{r}'\right|}$$

and $k$ being wavenumber. The integro-differential operator $\boldsymbol{\hat{n}} \times \boldsymbol{E}^\mathrm{s} \left(\boldsymbol{J} \right)$ is the one to be diagonalized via characteristic modes.

The governing equation of the CM decomposition is

$$\mathcal{X} \left(\boldsymbol{J}_n\right) = \lambda_n \mathcal{R} \left(\boldsymbol{J}_n\right) \qquad\mathrm{(1)}$$

with $\mathcal{R}$ and $\mathcal{X}$ being real and imaginary parts of impedance operator, respectively: $\mathcal{Z}(\cdot) = \mathcal{R}(\cdot) + \mathrm{j}\mathcal{X}(\cdot)\,.$ The operator, $\mathcal{Z}$ is defined by

$$\mathcal{Z} \left(\boldsymbol{J}\right) = \boldsymbol{\hat{n}} \times \boldsymbol{\hat{n}} \times \boldsymbol{E}^\mathrm{s} \left(\boldsymbol{J}\right). \qquad\mathrm{(2)}$$

The outcome of (1) is a set of characteristic modes $\left\{\boldsymbol{J}_n\right\}$, $n\in \left\{1,2,\dots\right\}$, accompanied by associated characteristic numbers $\left\{\lambda_n\right\}$. Clearly, (1) is a generalized eigenvalue problem, which, however, cannot be analytically solved (except for a few canonical bodies). Therefore, the numerical solution described in the following paragraph is commonly employed.

== Matrix formulation ==
Discretization $\mathcal{D}$ of the body of the scatterer $\Omega$ into $M$ subdomains as $\Omega^M = \mathcal{D}\left(\Omega\right)$ and using a set of linearly independent piece-wise continuous functions $\left\{\boldsymbol{\psi}_n\right\}$, $n\in\left\{1,\dots,N\right\}$, allows current density $\boldsymbol{J}$ to be represented as

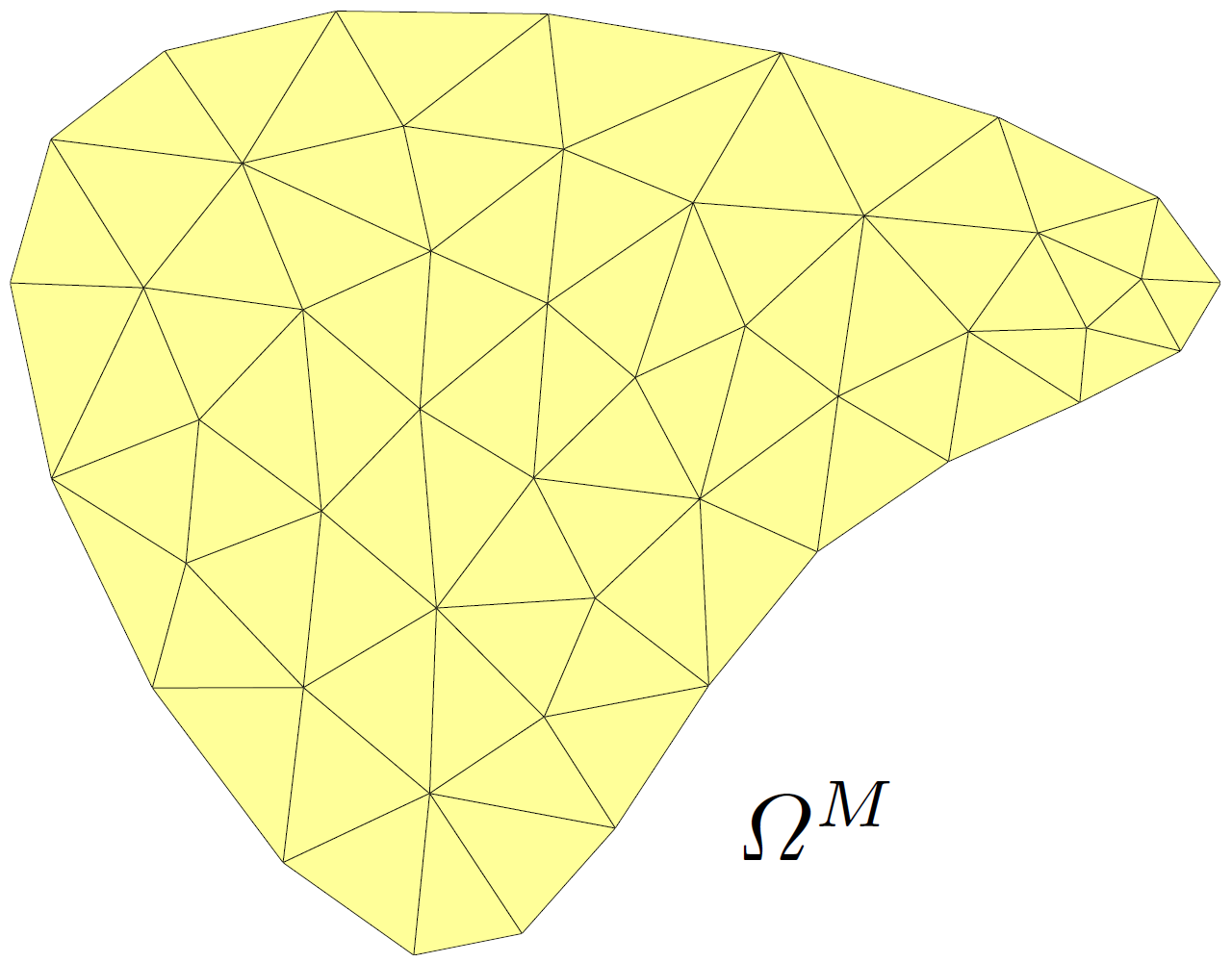
Example of a scatterer's triangular (Delaunay) discretization $\Omega^M$.

$$\boldsymbol{J} \left(\boldsymbol{r}\right) \approx \sum\limits_{n=1}^N I_n \boldsymbol{\psi}_n \left(\boldsymbol{r}\right)$$

and by applying the Galerkin method, the impedance operator (2)

$$\mathbf{Z} = \mathbf{R} + \mathrm{j} \mathbf{X} = \left[Z_{uv}\right] = \left[\,\int\limits_\Omega \boldsymbol{\psi}_u^\ast \cdot \mathcal{Z} \left(\boldsymbol{\psi}_v\right) \, \mathrm{d}S\right].$$

The eigenvalue problem (1) is then recast into its matrix form

$$\mathbf{X} \mathbf{I}_n = \lambda_n \mathbf{R}\mathbf{I}_n,$$

which can easily be solved using, e.g., the generalized Schur decomposition or the implicitly restarted Arnoldi method yielding a finite set of expansion coefficients $\left\{\mathbf{I}_n\right\}$ and associated characteristic numbers $\left\{\lambda_n\right\}$. The properties of the CM decomposition are investigated below.

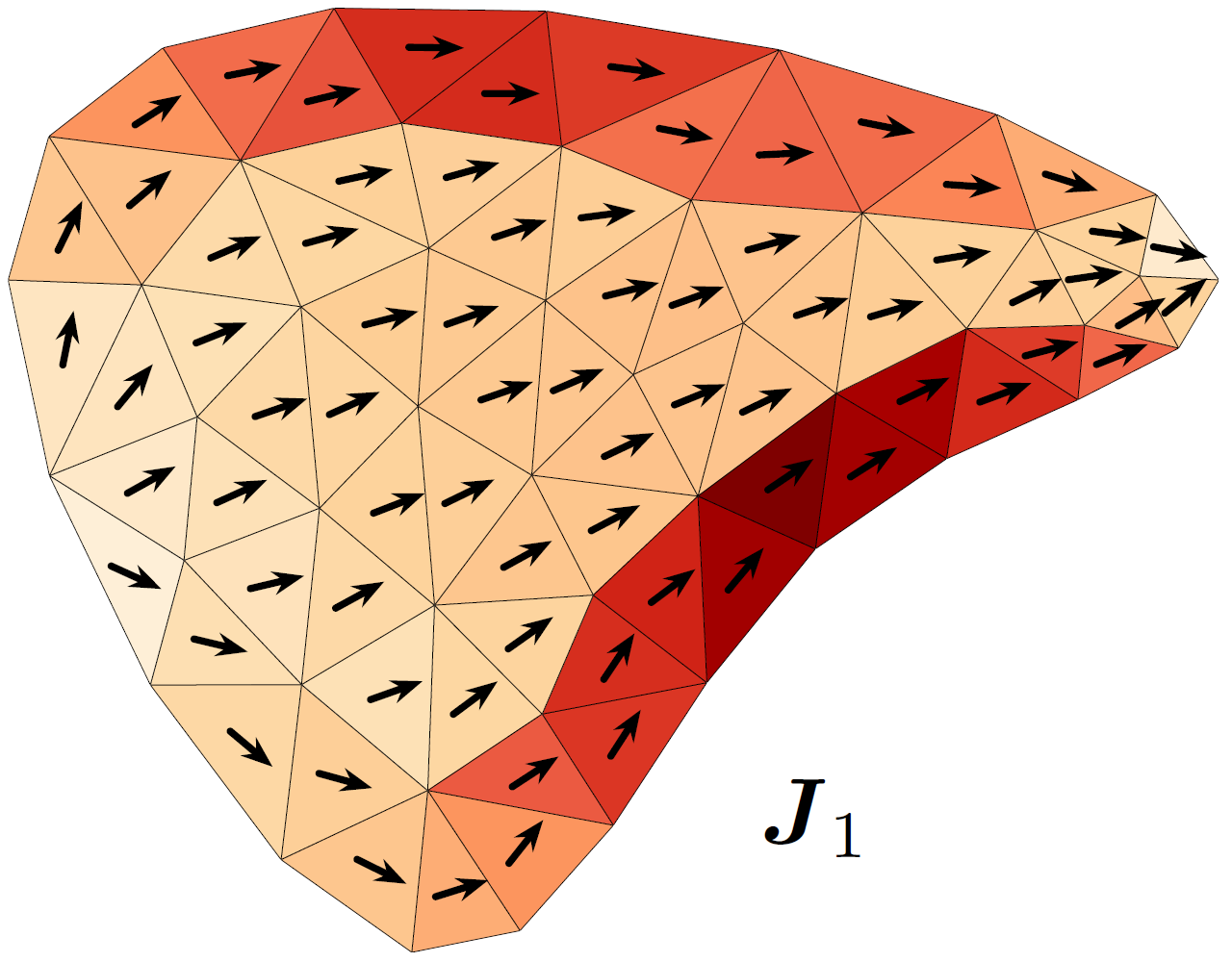
The first (dominant) characteristic mode of a shape $\Omega^M$.

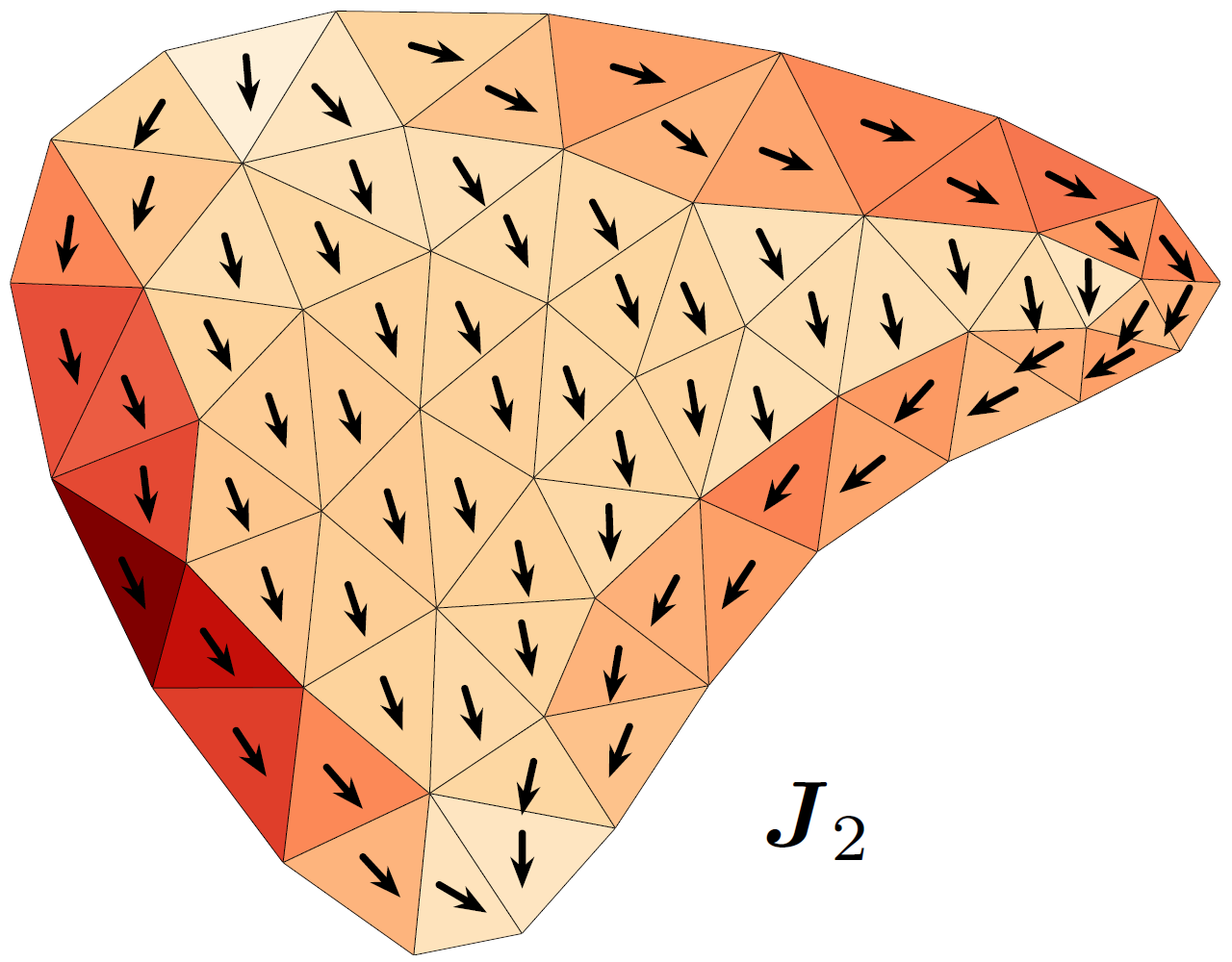
The second characteristic mode of a shape $\Omega^M$.

== Properties ==
The properties of CM decomposition are demonstrated in its matrix form.

First, recall that the bilinear forms

$$P_\mathrm{r} \approx \frac{1}{2} \mathbf{I}^\mathrm{H} \mathbf{R} \mathbf{I} \geq 0$$

and

$$2\omega\left(W_\mathrm{m} - W_\mathrm{e}\right) \approx \frac{1}{2} \mathbf{I}^\mathrm{H} \mathbf{X} \mathbf{I},$$

where superscript $^\mathrm{H}$ denotes the Hermitian transpose and where $\mathbf{I}$ represents an arbitrary surface current distribution, correspond to the radiated power and the reactive net power, respectively. The following properties can then be easily distilled:

- The weighting matrix $\mathbf{R}$ is theoretically positive definite and $\mathbf{X}$ is indefinite. The Rayleigh quotient

$$\lambda_n \approx \frac{\mathbf{I}_n^\mathrm{H}\mathbf{X}\mathbf{I}_n}{\mathbf{I}_n^\mathrm{H}\mathbf{R}\mathbf{I}_n}$$

then spans the range of $-\infty \leq \lambda_n \leq \infty$ and indicates whether the characteristic mode is capacitive ($\lambda_n < 0$), inductive ($\lambda_n > 0$), or in resonance ($\lambda_n = 0$). In reality, the Rayleigh quotient is limited by the numerical dynamics of the machine precision used and the number of correctly found modes is limited.

- The characteristic numbers evolve with frequency, i.e., $\lambda_n = \lambda_n \left(\omega\right)$, they can cross each other, or they can be the same (in case of degeneracies). For this reason, the tracking of modes is often applied to get smooth curves $\lambda_n \left(\omega\right)$. Unfortunately, this process is partly heuristic and the tracking algorithms are still far from perfection.
- The characteristic modes can be chosen as real-valued functions, $\mathbf{I}_n \in \mathbb{R}^{N\times 1}$. In other words, characteristic modes form a set of equiphase currents.
- The CM decomposition is invariant with respect to the amplitude of the characteristic modes. This fact is used to normalize the current so that they radiate unitary radiated power

$$\frac{1}{2} \mathbf{I}_m^\mathrm{H} \mathbf{Z} \mathbf{I}_n \approx \left(1 + \mathrm{j} \lambda_n\right) \delta_{mn}.$$

This last relation presents the ability of characteristic modes to diagonalize the impedance operator (2) and demonstrates far field orthogonality, i.e.,

$$\frac{1}{2} \sqrt{\frac{\varepsilon_0}{\mu_0}} \int\limits_0^{2\pi} \int\limits_0^\pi \boldsymbol{F}_m^\ast \cdot \boldsymbol{F}_n \sin \vartheta \, \mathrm{d} \vartheta \, \mathrm{d} \varphi = \delta_{mn}.$$

== Modal quantities ==
The modal currents can be used to evaluate antenna parameters in their modal form, for example:

- modal far-field $\boldsymbol{F}_n \left(\boldsymbol{\hat{e}}, \boldsymbol{\hat{r}}\right)$ ($\boldsymbol{\hat{e}}$ — polarization, $\boldsymbol{\hat{r}}$ — direction),
- modal directivity $\boldsymbol{D}_n \left(\boldsymbol{\hat{e}}, \boldsymbol{\hat{r}}\right)$,
- modal radiation efficiency $\eta_n$,
- modal quality factor $Q_n$,
- modal impedance $Z_n$.

These quantities can be used for analysis, feeding synthesis, radiator's shape optimization, or antenna characterization.

== Applications and further development ==
The number of potential applications is enormous and still growing:

- antenna analysis and synthesis,
- design of MIMO antennas,
- compact antenna design (RFID, Wi-Fi),
- UAV antennas,
- selective excitation of chassis and platforms,
- model order reduction,
- bandwidth enhancement,
- nanotubes and metamaterials,
- validation of computational electromagnetics codes.

The prospective topics include

- electrically large structures calculated using MLFMA,
- dielectrics,
- use of Combined Field Integral Equation,
- periodic structures,
- formulation for arrays.

== Software ==
CM decomposition has recently been implemented in major electromagnetic simulators, namely in FEKO, CST-MWS, and WIPL-D. Other packages are about to support it soon, for example HFSS and CEM One. In addition, there is a plethora of in-house and academic packages which are capable of evaluating CM and many associated parameters.

== Alternative bases ==
CM are useful to understand radiator's operation better. They have been used with great success for many practical purposes. However, it is important to stress that they are not perfect and it is often better to use other formulations such as energy modes, radiation modes, stored energy modes or radiation efficiency modes.
