= Matrix pencil =

Concept in linear algebra

In linear algebra, a matrix pencil is a matrix-valued function defined on a field $K$, usually the real or complex numbers.

== Definition ==
Let $K$ be a field (typically, $K \in \{ \mathbb R, \mathbb C \}$; the definition can be generalized to rngs, i.e. non-unital rings), and let $n > 0$ be a positive integer. Then any matrix-valued function

$$P \colon K \to \mathrm{Mat}(K, n \times n)$$

(where $\mathrm{Mat}(K, n \times n)$ denotes the $K$-algebra of $n\times n$ matrices over $K$) is called a matrix pencil.

=== Polynomial matrix pencils ===
An important special case arises when $P$ is polynomial: let $\ell \ge 0$ be a non-negative integer, and let $A_0, A_1, \dots, A_\ell$ be $n\times n$ matrices (i. e. $A_i \in \mathrm{Mat}(K, n \times n)$ for all $i = 0, \dots, \ell$). Then the polynomial matrix pencil (often simply a matrix pencil) defined by $A_0, \dots, A_\ell$ is the matrix-valued function $L \colon K \to \mathrm{Mat}(K, n \times n)$ defined by

$$L(\lambda) = \sum_{i=0}^\ell \lambda^i A_i.$$

The degree of this matrix pencil is defined as the largest integer $0 \le k \le \ell$ such that $A_k \ne 0$, the $n \times n$ zero matrix over $K$.

=== Linear matrix pencils ===
A particular case is a linear matrix pencil $L(\lambda) = A - \lambda B$ (where $B \ne 0$). We denote it briefly with the notation $(A, B)$, and note that using the more general notation, $A_0 = A$ and $A_1 = -B$ (not $B$).

== Generalized eigenvalues of matrix pencils ==
For a matrix pencil $P$, any $k \in K$ such that $\det P(k) = 0_K$ is called a generalized eigenvalue (often simply eigenvalue) of $P$, and the set of generalized eigenvalues of $P$ is called its spectrum and is denoted by

$$\sigma(P) = \{ k \in K : \det P(k) = 0_K \}.$$

For a polynomial matrix pencil, we write $\sigma(A_0, \dots, A_\ell)$; for the linear pencil $(A, B)$, we write as $\sigma(A, B)$ (not $\sigma(A, -B)$).

The generalized eigenvalues of the linear matrix pencil $(A, I)$ are precisely the matrix eigenvalues of $A$. The general linear pencil $(A, B)$ is said to have one or more eigenvalues at infinity if $B$ has one or more 0 eigenvalues.

A pencil is called regular if there is at least one $k \in K$ such that $\det P(k) \ne 0_K$, i. e. if $\sigma(P) \ne K$; otherwise it is called singular.

== Applications ==
Matrix pencils play an important role in numerical linear algebra. The problem of finding the generalized eigenvalues of a pencil is called the generalized eigenvalue problem. The most popular algorithm for this task is the QZ algorithm, an implicit version of the QR algorithm for solving the eigenvalue problem $Ax = \lambda Bx$ without inverting the matrix $B$ (which is impossible when $B$ is singular, or numerically unstable when it is ill-conditioned).

== Pencils generated by commuting matrices ==
If $AB = BA$, then the pencil generated by $A$ and $B$:

1. consists only of matrices similar to a diagonal matrix, or
2. has no matrices in it similar to a diagonal matrix, or
3. has exactly one matrix in it similar to a diagonal matrix.

== See also ==
- Generalized eigenvalue problem
- Generalized pencil-of-function method
- Nonlinear eigenproblem
- Quadratic eigenvalue problem
- Generalized Rayleigh quotient
