= Electric-field integral equation =

Calculation of electric field generated by current distribution

The electric-field integral equation is a relationship that allows the calculation of an electric field (E) generated by an electric current distribution (J).

== Derivation ==
When all quantities in the frequency domain are considered, a time-dependency $e^{jwt}$ that is suppressed throughout is assumed.

Beginning with the Maxwell equations relating the electric and magnetic field, and assuming a linear, homogeneous media with permeability $\mu$ and permittivity $\varepsilon\,$:
$$\begin{align}
\nabla \times \mathbf{E} &= -j \omega \mu \mathbf{H} \\[1ex]
\nabla \times \mathbf{H} &=  j \omega \varepsilon \mathbf{E} + \mathbf{J}
\end{align}$$

Following the third equation involving the divergence of H
$$\nabla \cdot \mathbf{H} = 0\,$$
by vector calculus we can write any divergenceless vector as the curl of another vector, hence
$$\nabla \times \mathbf{A} = \mathbf{B}$$
where A is called the magnetic vector potential. Substituting this into the above we get
$$\nabla \times (\mathbf{E}  + j \omega \mathbf{A}) = 0$$
and any curl-free vector can be written as the gradient of a scalar, hence
$$\mathbf{E} + j \omega \mathbf{A} = - \nabla \Phi$$
where $\Phi$ is the electric scalar potential. (Note: This is the general definition of the electric scalar potential. In the special case when the magnetic field is static (time invariant), it reduces to the more familiar $\mathbf{E} = - \nabla \Phi$.) These relationships now allow us to write
$$\frac{1}{\mu}\nabla \times \nabla \times \mathbf{A} - \frac{1}{\mu}k^2\mathbf{A} = \mathbf{J} - j \omega \varepsilon \nabla \Phi$$
where $k = \omega \sqrt{\mu \varepsilon}$, which can be rewritten by vector identity as
$$\frac{1}{\mu} \nabla (\nabla \cdot \mathbf{A}) - \frac{1}{\mu} \nabla^2 \mathbf{A} - \frac{1}{\mu} k^2 \mathbf{A} = \mathbf{J} - j \omega \varepsilon \nabla \Phi$$

As we have only specified the curl of A, we are free to define the divergence, and choose the following:
$$\nabla \cdot \mathbf{A} = - j \omega \varepsilon \mu \Phi \,$$
which is called the Lorenz gauge condition. The previous expression for A now reduces to
$$\frac{1}{\mu} \nabla^2 \mathbf{A} + \frac{1}{\mu} k^2\mathbf{A} = -\mathbf{J}\,$$
which is the vector Helmholtz equation. The solution of this equation for A is
$$\mathbf{A}(\mathbf{r}) = \frac{\mu}{4 \pi} \int \mathbf{J}(\mathbf{r}^{\prime}) \ G(\mathbf{r}, \mathbf{r}^{\prime}) \, d\mathbf{r}^{\prime}$$
where $G(\mathbf{r}, \mathbf{r}^{\prime})$ is the three-dimensional homogeneous Green's function given by
$$G(\mathbf{r}, \mathbf{r}^{\prime}) = \frac{e^{-j k \left|\mathbf{r} - \mathbf{r}^{\prime}\right|}}{\left|\mathbf{r} - \mathbf{r}^{\prime}\right|}$$

By combining the above definitions of the electric scalar potential and the Lorenz gauge, we can now write what is called the electric field integral equation (EFIE), relating the electric field E to the vector potential A
$$\mathbf{E} = -j \omega \mathbf{A} + \frac{1}{j \omega \varepsilon} \nabla (\nabla \cdot \mathbf{A})\,$$

We can further represent the EFIE in the dyadic form as
$$\mathbf{E} = -j \omega \mu \int_V d \mathbf{r}^{\prime} \mathbf{G}(\mathbf{r}, \mathbf{r}^{\prime}) \cdot \mathbf{J}(\mathbf{r}^{\prime}) \,$$
where $\mathbf{G}(\mathbf{r}, \mathbf{r}^{\prime})\,$ here is the dyadic homogeneous Green's Function given by
$$\mathbf{G}(\mathbf{r}, \mathbf{r}^{\prime}) = \frac{1}{4 \pi} \left[ \mathbf{I}+\frac{\nabla \nabla}{k^2} \right] G(\mathbf{r}, \mathbf{r}^{\prime})$$

== Interpretation ==
The EFIE describes a radiated field E given a set of sources J, and as such it is the fundamental equation used in antenna analysis and design. It is a very general relationship that can be used to compute the radiated field of any sort of antenna once the current distribution on it is known. The most important aspect of the EFIE is that it allows us to solve the radiation/scattering problem in an unbounded region, or one whose boundary is located at infinity. For closed surfaces, it is possible to use the Magnetic Field Integral Equation or the Combined Field Integral Equation, both of which result in a set of equations with improved condition number compared to the EFIE. However, the MFIE and CFIE can still contain resonances.

In scattering problems, it is desirable to determine an unknown scattered field $E_{s}$ that is due to a known incident field $E_{i}$. Unfortunately, the EFIE relates the scattered field to J, not the incident field, so we do not know what J is. This sort of problem can be solved by imposing the boundary conditions on the incident and scattered field, allowing one to write the EFIE in terms of $E_{i}$ and J alone. Once this has been done, the integral equation can then be solved by a numerical technique appropriate to integral equations such as the method of moments.

== Applications ==
The EFIE is often used to calculated electromagnetic fields via the method of moments.
