= Pinsel =

Pinsel may refer to:

- Type of heraldic flag
- Johann Georg Pinsel, 18th-century sculptor from Red Ruthenia
