= Flying pencil =

Flying pencil may refer to:

- Dornier Do 17, A German WWII-era light bomber
  - Dornier Do 215, a successor to the Do 17
- Boeing 757, a narrow-body twinjet airliner
- Michael Britt (1960–2017), American basketball player
