= Lan Jen Chu =

American engineer (1913–1973)

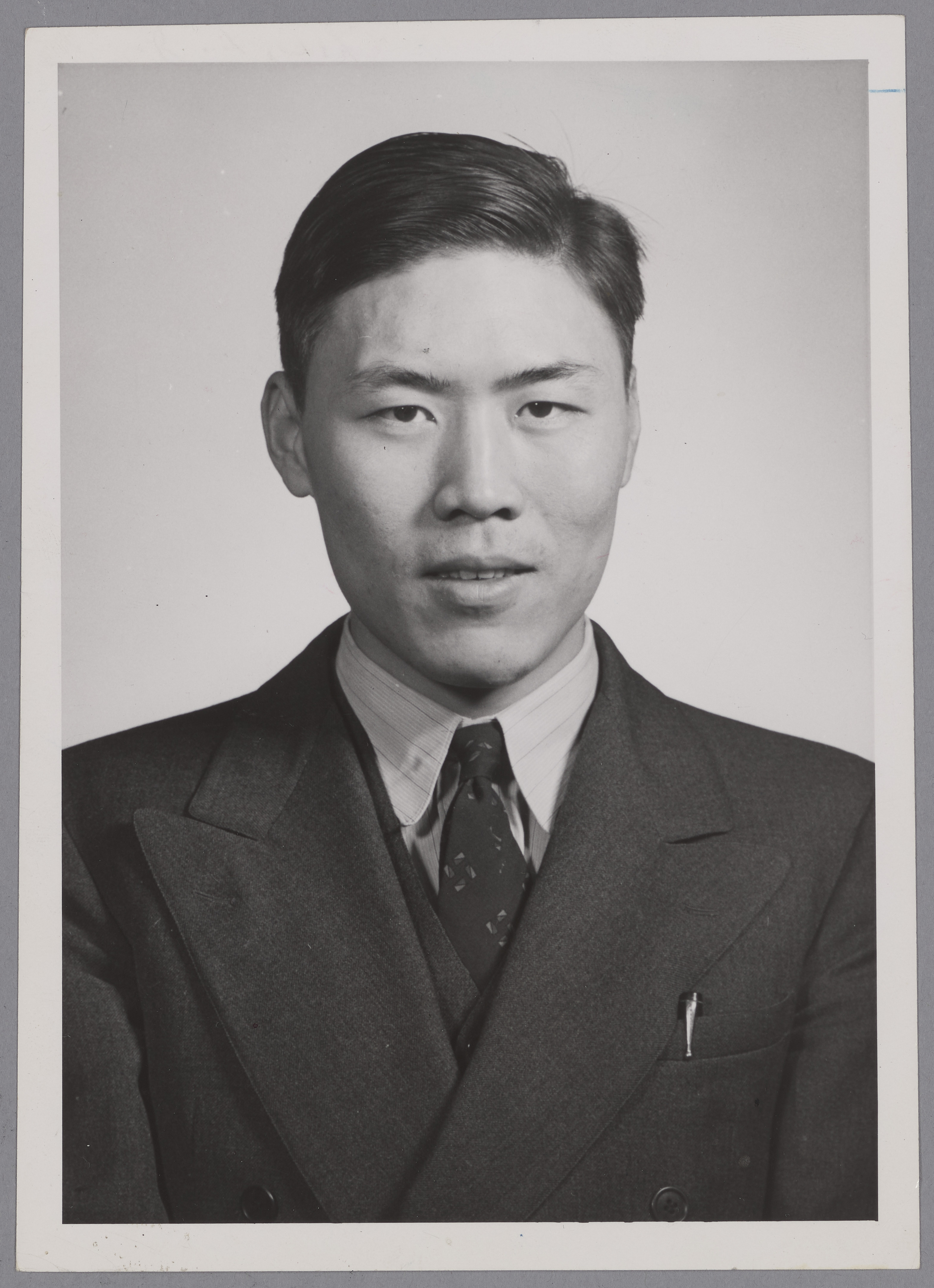
- Chu c. 1952
- Born: August 24, 1913; Huai'an, Jiangsu, China
- Died: July 25, 1973 (aged 59); Lexington, Massachusetts, U.S.
- Education: Shanghai Jiao Tong University; Massachusetts Institute of Technology
- Known for: Stratton-Chu integral equation; Chu–Harrington limit
- Awards: Fellow of APS; Fellow of IRE
- Scientific career
- Fields: Electrical engineering
- Workplaces: Massachusetts Institute of Technology
- Thesis: Transmission and radiation of electromagnetic waves in hollow-pipes and horns (1938)
- Doctoral advisor: Wilmer Barrow; Julius Adams Stratton
- Doctoral students: Frederic Morgenthaler; Hermann A. Haus

Lan Jen Chu (August 24, 1913 – July 25, 1973) was a Chinese-born American electrical engineer and a professor of electrical engineering at the Massachusetts Institute of Technology. Chu is noted for his work on the fundamental limitations for small antennas, also known as Chu–Harrington limit.

== Biography ==
Lan Jen Chu was born on August 24, 1913, in Huai'an in the Jiangsu province of China. He graduated from Shanghai Jiao Tong University in 1934 with a Bachelor of Science degree in electrical power, and went on to receive Master of Science and Doctorate of Science degrees in electrical engineering from MIT in 1935 and 1938, respectively. Chu was with the Radiation Laboratory at MIT from 1942 to 1946 and with the Department of Electrical Engineering from 1947 to 1973. He died on July 25, 1973, in Lexington, Massachusetts, and was survived by his wife Grace Feng and three children.

During World War II, Chu supervised research at MIT of many special antennas for use in radar and telecommunication applications. In 1945, he acted as a United States Secretary of War and headed the advisory specialist group to United States Armed Forces in China. For his services, he received the President's Certificate of Merit. He has also authored three technical books, two of which were with Richard Adler and Robert Fano in the area of electromagnetics. Lan Jen Chu was a fellow of the American Physical Society and the Institute of Radio Engineers, as well as a member of Academia Sinica.

== Publications ==
=== Books ===
- Adler RB, Chu LJ, Fano RM, Electromagnetic Energy Transmission and Radiation, MIT, 1968.
- Fano RM, Chu LJ, Adler RB, Electromagnetic Fields, Energy, and Forces, MIT, 1968.
- Stratton JA, Morse PM, Chu LJ, Hunter RA, Elliptic Cylinder and Spheroidal Wave Functions: Including Tables of Separation Constants and Coefficients, Wiley-MIT, 1941.
- Stratton JA, Morse PM, Chu LJ, Little JDC, Corbató FJ, Spheroidal Wave Functions: Including Tables of Separation Constants and Coefficients, MIT, 1956.

=== Book chapters ===
- Stratton JA, Electromagnetic Theory, Wiley-IEEE, 2007, pp. 464–470.
