= Magdalena Salazar Palma =

Spanish radio engineer

Magdalena Salazar Palma (born 1949) is a Spanish electrical engineer focusing on the computational modeling of wireless communications and antennas. She is a professor emeritus in the Department of Signal Theory and Communications at Charles III University of Madrid.

== Education and career ==
Salazar was born on 15 June 1949 in Granada, the granddaughter of a telecommunications engineer. She earned a telecommunication engineering degree from the Technical University of Madrid in 1975. and completed a Ph.D. in electrical and electronic engineering there in 1995.

She became an assistant professor at the Technical University of Madrid in 1972. After completing her Ph.D., she was promoted to associate professor in 1996. She moved to Charles III University of Madrid in 2004, at first as an associate professor and then in 2005 as a full professor. She became an emeritus professor in 2020.

She was president of IEEE Spain from 1997 to 2001, chair of IEEE Women in Engineering for 2004–2005, and president of the IEEE Antennas and Propagation Society for 2011.

== Recognition ==
Salazar was elected to the 2014 class of IEEE Fellows "for contributions to the application of numerical techniques to electromagnetic modeling". She has an honorary doctorate from Aalto University in Finland, awarded in 2016.
