= Konstantina Nikita =

Greek engineer

Konstantina (Nantia) Nikita
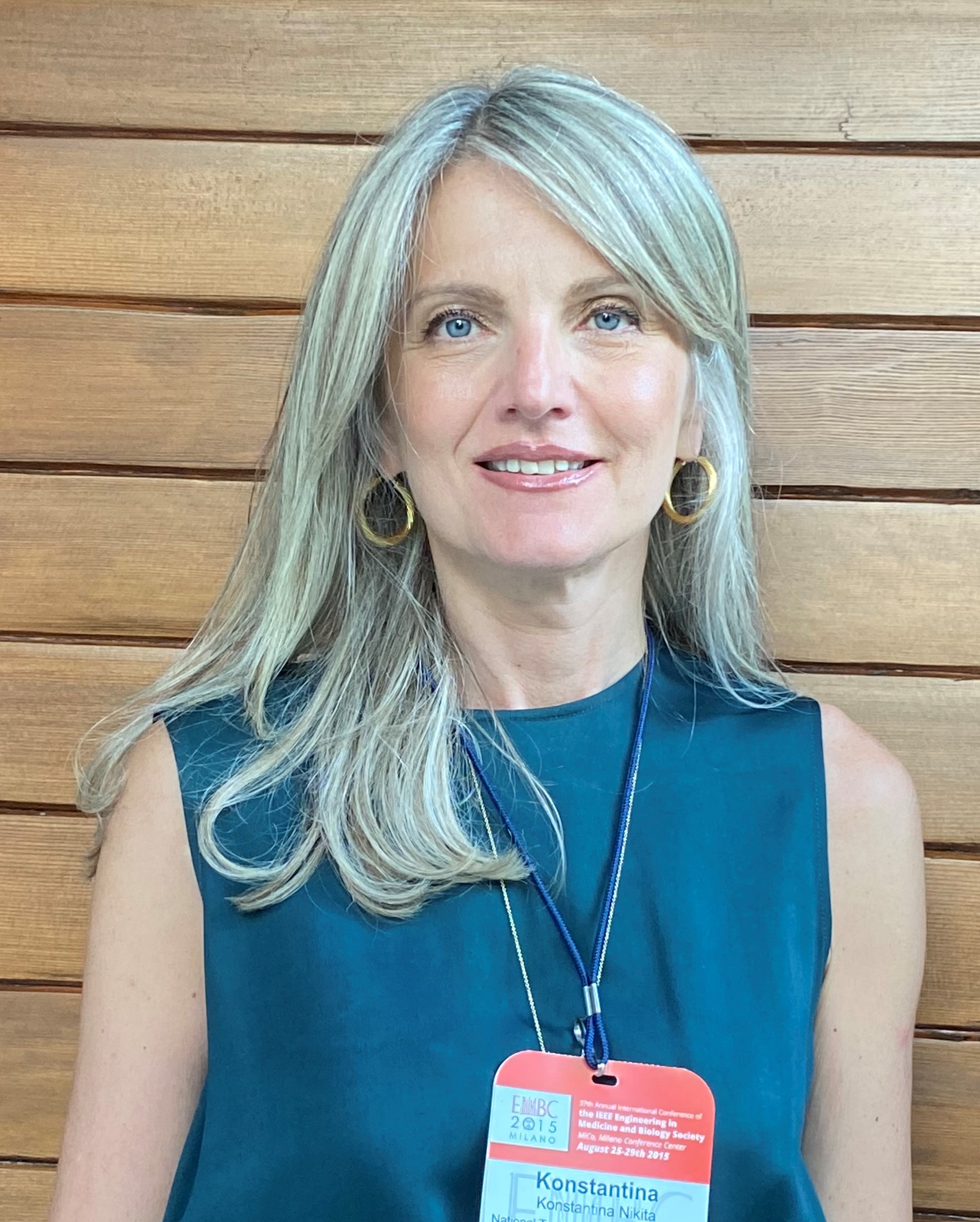
- Education: National Technical University of Athens (M.Eng., Ph.D.); National and Kapodistrian University of Athens (M.D.)
- Known for: Bioelectromagnetics, on- body and in-body devices, multiscale modelling, intelligent processing of health data
- Awards: Bodossakis Foundation Academic Prize (2003); EAMBES Founding Fellow (2012) AIMBE Fellow (2016) IEEE Fellow (2018)
- Scientific career
- Fields: Electrical Engineering, medicine
- Workplaces: National Technical University of Athens; Institute of Communication and Computer Systems; University of Southern California
- Academic advisors: Nikolaos K. Uzunoglu

Konstantina "Nantia" Nikita is a Greek electrical and computer engineer and a professor at the School of Electrical and Computer Engineering at the National Technical University of Athens (NTUA), Greece. She is director of the Mobile Radiocommunications Lab and founder and director of the Biomedical Simulations and Imaging Lab, NTUA. Since 2015, she has been an Irene McCulloch Distinguished Adjunct Professor of Biomedical Engineering and Medicine at Keck School of Medicine and Viterbi School of Engineering, University of Southern California.

== Education, career and research ==
Nikita received the diploma in Electrical Engineering and the Ph.D. degree from the NTUA, as well as the M.D. degree from the Medical School, University of Athens. From 1990 to 1996, she worked as a researcher at the Institute of Communication and Computer Systems. In 1996, she joined the faculty of the School of Electrical and Computer Engineering, NTUA, as an assistant professor, and since 2005, she serves as a professor at the same school.

Trained as both a physician and engineer, she works to adapt technologies developed in the antennas and computer industry for healthcare innovation. Nikita leverages technologies at the intersection of (bio-)electromagnetics, sensors, and materials to yield next-generation wearables and implants characterized by extreme miniaturization and enhanced performance. She integrates data acquired from health monitoring systems with multiscale, multilevel modeling and intelligent decision-making techniques to diagnose, study and treat a variety of diseases including diabetes, obesity, cardiovascular disease, cancer, as well as neurological, mental and cognitive disorders.

Her work refers to both fundamental problems, which require the use of sophisticated methods of theoretical analysis, and to the design and construction of experimental prototypes and intelligent health monitoring systems based on theoretical results of her work.

She is credited with pioneering the modelling of complex human diseases, such as diabetes and neurodegenerative diseases, by developing personalized multiscale models providing enhanced understanding of pathophysiological mechanisms, facilitating self-disease management and assisting therapeutic interventions. She employed machine learning techniques exploiting medical, lifestyle, environmental, and genetic data and integrated them with existing pathophysiological knowledge and models in order to devise personalized markers for the early detection and assessment of an array of highly prevalent diseases. By multiscale modeling of carotid atherosclerosis, Nikita and her team introduced novel low-cost biomarkers for CVD/stroke risk assessment, bridging the gap between multifaceted phenotypes, incorporating image analysis-based indices, and pathophysiological mechanisms, underlying plaque vulnerability and rupture.

Nikita and her team developed smart systems, which incorporate sensing, computing and communication technologies, software/hardware modeling and system architectures for the monitoring, treatment, motivation and coaching of patients with diabetes and other chronic conditions.

Her early research has significantly advanced mobile phone technology and has markedly improved hyperthermia technology and treatment efficacy, including pioneering intra-operative treatment of pancreatic cancer.

She has been the technical manager of numerous European and National R&D projects on fundamental research and practical applications. She is the editor-in-chief of the IEEE Open Journal of Antennas and Propagation. She has been Chair of the program/organizing committee of and has served as keynote speaker at several international conferences and symposia. She is a Fellow of the Institute of Electrical and Electronics Engineers (IEEE), a Founding Fellow of the European Association of Medical and Biological Engineering and Science (EAMBES), a Fellow of the American Institute of Medical and Biological Engineering (AIMBE). She serves as chair of the LS7 Consolidator Grant Panel of the European Research Council (ERC), for granting investigator-driven frontier research in the domain of life sciences. She has been a member of the Board of Directors of the Atomic Energy Commission, the Hellenic National Academic Recognition and Information Center, the Hellenic National Council of Research and Technology and the Hellenic National Ethics Committee. She is a member of the IEEE-EMBS Technical Committee on Biomedical and Health Informatics (TC BHI), Chair of the IEEE Greece Section and Deputy Dean of the School of Electrical and Computer Engineering of the NTUA. She is the author of the “Handbook of Biomedical Telemetry” and of more than 180 journal publications, 350 conference proceedings papers and three patents.

== Books ==
- Nikita, Konstantina S. (2014). Handbook of Biomedical Telemetry. Wiley-IEEE Press.
- Kanatas, Athanasios G.; Nikita, Konstantina S.; Mathiopoulos, Panagiotis (2017). Kanatas, Athanasios G; Nikita, Konstantina S; Mathiopoulos, Panagiotis (eds.). New Directions in Wireless Communications Systems: From Mobile to 5G. CRC Press. doi:10.1201/9781315155821. ISBN 9781315155821.
- Golemati, Spyretta; Nikita, Konstantina S. (2019). Cardiovascular Computing-Methodologies and Clinical Applications. Series in BioEngineering. Springer. doi:10.1007/978-981-10-5092-3. ISBN 978-981-10-5091-6.

== Edited volumes ==
- Lin, James C.; Nikita, Konstantina S. (2010). Wireless Mobile Communication and Healthcare. Springer-Verlag.
- Nikita, Konstantina S.; Lin, James C.; Fotiadis, Dimitrios I.; Arredondo Waldmeyer, Maria-Teresa (2011). Wireless Mobile Communication and Healthcare. Springer-Verlag.
- Godara, Balwant; Nikita, Konstantina S. (2013). Wireless Mobile Communication and Healthcare: Third International Conference, MobiHealth 2012, Paris, France, November 21-23, 2012, Revised Selected Papers. Springer-Verlag.
- Nikita, Konstantina S.; Bourbakis, Nikolaos; Lo, Benny; Fotiadis, Dimitrios I.; Hao, Yang; Kiourti, Asimina (2014). Transforming healthcare through innovations in mobile and wireless technologies. IEEE.

== Awards ==
Konstantina Nikita is the recipient of a number of awards and honors including the following:

- 2003, Bodossakis Foundation Academic Prize for exceptional achievements in Theory and Applications of Information Technology in Medicine
- 2012, Founding Fellow of the European Association of Medical and Biological Engineering and Science (EAMBES)
- 2016, Fellow of the American Institute of Medical and Biological Engineering (AIMBE) for contributions to modeling bioelectromagnetic interactions and biomedical imaging
- 2018, Fellow of the Institute of Electrical and Electronics Engineers (IEEE) for contributions to bioelectromagnetics and implantable antennas for medical applications
