= IEEE Transactions on Antennas and Propagation =

- Discipline: Antenna technology, electromagnetic propagation, scattering
- Language: English
- Edited by: Konstantina Nikita

Publication details
- Former names: Transactions of the IRE PGAP (1952–1955); IRE Transactions on Antennas and Propagation (1955–1962) IEEE Transactions on Antennas and Propagation (1962–present)
- History: 1952–present
- Publisher: IEEE Antennas & Propagation Society
- Frequency: Monthly
- Impact factor: 5.9 (2025)

Standard abbreviations
- ISO 4: IEEE Trans. Antennas Propag.
- MathSciNet: IEEE Trans. Antennas and Propagation

Indexing
- CODEN: IETPAK
- ISSN: 0018-926X (print); 1558-2221 (web)
- LCCN: 57039363
- OCLC no.: 807591715

Links
- Journal homepage; Online access

IEEE Transactions on Antennas and Propagation is a peer-reviewed scientific journal published by the IEEE Antennas & Propagation Society. It covers research on and applications of all aspects of antenna technology and the propagation of electromagnetic waves. The journal was established in 1952 and since 2022 the Editor-in-chief is Konstantina Nikita. Since 1952, this journal has delivered many thousands of articles on a wide range of topics of interest to specialists, practicing engineers, educators and students in the field of interest of the IEEE Antennas & Propagation Society. The Transactions publishes 12 issues per year and occasional Special Issues amounting to about 6000 pages annually.

== Abstracting and indexing ==
The journal is abstracted and indexed in the Science Citation Index and Current Contents/Engineering, Computing & Technology. According to the Journal Citation Reports, the journal has a 2025 impact factor of 5.9.

== See also ==
- IEEE Antennas and Wireless Propagation Letters
