= IEEE Transactions on Microwave Theory and Techniques =

Journal

- Discipline: Microwave Theory, Techniques, and Applications
- Language: English
- Edited by: Almudena Suárez

Publication details
- Former names: Transactions of the IRE Professional Group on Microwave Theory and Techniques (1953-1955), IRE Transactions on Microwaves and Techniques (1955-1962)
- History: 1953–present
- Publisher: IEEE Microwave Theory and Techniques Society (USA)
- Frequency: Monthly
- Impact factor: 4.1 (2023)

Standard abbreviations
- ISO 4: IEEE Trans. Microw. Theory Tech.

Indexing
- ISSN: 0018-9480
- OCLC no.: 1752555

Links
- Journal homepage; Online access

IEEE Transactions on Microwave Theory and Techniques (T-MTT) is a monthly peer-reviewed scientific journal with a focus on that part of engineering and theory associated with microwave/millimeter-wave technology and components, electronic devices, guided wave structures and theory, electromagnetic theory, and Radio Frequency Hybrid and Monolithic Integrated Circuits, including mixed-signal circuits, from a few MHz to THz.

T-MTT is published by the IEEE Microwave Theory and Techniques Society. T-MTT was established in 1953 as the Transactions of the IRE Professional Group on Microwave Theory and Techniques. From 1955 T-MTT was published as the IRE Transactions on Microwave Theory and Techniques and was finally the current denomination since 1963.

The editors-in-chief is Almudena Suarez (University of Cantabria). According to the Journal Citation Reports, the journal has a 2023 impact factor of 4.1.
