= List of textbooks in electromagnetism =

List of physics and engineering textbooks covering electromagnetism

The study of electromagnetism in higher education, as a fundamental part of both physics and electrical engineering, is typically accompanied by textbooks devoted to the subject. The American Physical Society and the American Association of Physics Teachers recommend a full year of graduate study in electromagnetism for all physics graduate students. A joint task force by those organizations in 2006 found that in 76 of the 80 US physics departments surveyed, a course using John Jackson's Classical Electrodynamics was required for all first year graduate students. For undergraduates, there are several widely used textbooks, including David Griffiths' Introduction to Electrodynamics and Electricity and Magnetism by Edward Purcell and David Morin. Also at an undergraduate level, Richard Feynman's classic Lectures on Physics is available online to read for free.

== Physics ==
=== Undergraduate (introductory and intermediate) ===
There are several widely used undergraduate textbooks in electromagnetism, including David Griffiths' Introduction to Electrodynamics as well as Electricity and Magnetism by Edward Purcell and David Morin. Richard Feynman's Lectures on Physics also include a volume on electromagnetism that is available to read online for free, through the California Institute of Technology. In addition, there are popular physics textbooks that include electricity and magnetism among the material they cover, such as David Halliday and Robert Resnick's Fundamentals of Physics.

- Davidson PA, An Introduction to Electrodynamics, Oxford University, 2019.
- Feynman RP, Leighton RB, Sands M, Electromagnetism and Matter, Basic Books, 2010. (Note: Reissue of the 1964 textbook published by Addison-Wesley.) (Note: Second volume in the book series The Feynman Lectures on Physics. In the first volume of the series which is titled Mechanics, Radiation, and Heat, there are also some topics about electromagnetism and optics.)
- Grant IS, Phillips WR, Electromagnetism, 2nd ed, Wiley, 1990.
- Griffiths DJ, Introduction to Electrodynamics, 5th ed, Cambridge University, 2024.
- Halliday D, Resnick R, Walker J, Fundamentals of Physics, Extended 12th ed, Wiley, 2022.
- Heald MA, Marion JB, Classical Electromagnetic Radiation, 3rd ed, Dover, 2012. (Note: Reissue of the 1995 textbook published by Saunders.) (Note: This is an intermediate textbook also suitable for graduate studies.)
- Müller-Kirsten HJW, Electrodynamics, 3rd ed, World Scientific, 2026.
- Ohanian HC, Classical Electrodynamics, 2nd ed, Jones & Bartlett, 2006.
- Pauli W, Electrodynamics, Dover, 2000. (Note: Reissue of the 1973 textbook published by MIT.) (Note: First volume in the book series Pauli Lectures on Physics.)
- Pollack GL, Stump DR, Electromagnetism, Addison-Wesley, 2002.
- Purcell EM, Morin DJ, Electricity and Magnetism, 3rd ed, Cambridge University, 2013.
- Reitz JR, Milford FJ, Christy RW, Foundations of Electromagnetic Theory, 4th ed, Pearson, 2009.
- Saslow W, Electricity Magnetism and Light, Academic, 2002.
- Schwartz M, Principles of Electrodynamics, Dover, 1987. (Note: Reissue of the 1972 textbook published by McGraw Hill.)
- Tamm IE, Fundamentals of the Theory of Electricity, Mir, 9th ed, 1979.
- Vanderlinde J, Classical Electromagnetic Theory, 2nd ed, Springer, 2004.
- Wangsness RK, Electromagnetic Fields, 2nd ed, Wiley, 1986.

=== Graduate ===
A 2006 report by a joint taskforce between the American Physical Society and the American Association of Physics Teachers found that 76 of the 80 physics departments surveyed require a first-year graduate course in John Jackson's Classical Electrodynamics. This made Jackson's book the most popular textbook in any field of graduate-level physics, with Herbert Goldstein's Classical Mechanics as the second most popular with adoption at 48 universities. James Russ, professor of physics at Carnegie Mellon University, claims Jackson's textbook has been "[t]he classic electrodynamics text for the past four decades" and that it is "the book from which most current-generation physicists took their first course." In addition to Jackson's textbook there are other classic textbooks like Classical Electricity and Magnetism by Pief Panofsky and Melba Phillips, and Electrodynamics of Continuous Media by Lev Landau, Evgeny Lifshitz, and Lev Pitaevskii, both pre-dating Jackson's book. Among the textbooks published after Jackson's book, Julian Schwinger's 1970s lecture notes is a mentionable book first published in 1998 posthumously. Due to the domination of Jackson's textbook in graduate physics education, even physicists like Schwinger became frustrated competing with Jackson and because of this, the publication of Schwinger's book was postponed so that it was finally completed and published by his colleagues.

In addition to the mentioned classic books, in recent years there have been a few well-received electromagnetic textbooks published for graduate studies in physics, with one of the most notable being Modern Electrodynamics by Andrew Zangwill published in 2013, which has been praised by many physicists like John Joannopoulos, Michael Berry, Rob Phillips, Alain Aspect, Roberto Merlin, Shirley Chiang, Roy Schwitters but also well received in the electrical engineering community. Another notable textbook is Classical Electromagnetism in a Nutshell by Anupam Garg published in 2012, which has been also praised by physicists like Anthony Zee, Ramamurti Shankar, Jainendra Jain, John Belcher.

Here is the list of some important textbooks that discuss generic physical areas of electromagnetism.

- Brau CA, Modern Problems in Classical Electrodynamics, Oxford University, 2004.
- Chaichian M, Merches I, Radu D, Tureanu A, Electrodynamics: An Intensive Course, Springer, 2016.
- Di Bartolo B, Classical Theory of Electromagnetism, 3rd ed, World Scientific, 2018.
- Franklin J, Classical Electromagnetism, 2nd ed, Dover, 2017.
- Freeman R, King J, Lafyatis G, Electromagnetic Radiation, Oxford University, 2019.
- Garg A, Classical Electromagnetism in a Nutshell, Princeton University, 2012.
- Good RH, Nelson TJ, Classical Theory of Electric and Magnetic Fields, Academic, 1971.
- Jackson JD, Classical Electrodynamics, 3rd ed, Wiley, 1999.
- Jentschura UD, Advanced Classical Electrodynamics: Green Functions, Regularizations, Multipole Decompositions, World Scientific, 2017.
- Landau LD, Lifshitz EM, Pitaevskii LP, Electrodynamics of Continuous Media, 2nd ed, Pergamon, 1984. (Note: Eighth volume in the book series Landau and Lifshitz Course of Theoretical Physics.)
- Maggiore M, A Modern Introduction to Classical Electrodynamics, Oxford University, 2023.
- Melia F, Electrodynamics, University of Chicago, 2001.
- Milton KA, Schwinger J, Classical Electrodynamics, 2nd ed, CRC, 2024.
- Panofsky WKH, Phillips M, Classical Electricity and Magnetism, 2nd ed, Dover, 2005. (Note: Reissue of the 1962 textbook published by Addison-Wesley.)
- Sommerfeld A, Electrodynamics, Academic, 1952. (Note: Third volume in the book series Sommerfeld Lectures on Theoretical Physics.)
- Wald RM, Advanced Classical Electromagnetism, Princeton University, 2022.
- Wilcox W, Thron C, Macroscopic Electrodynamics: An Introductory Graduate Treatment, 2nd ed, World Scientific, 2024.
- Zangwill A, Modern Electrodynamics, Cambridge University, 2013.

=== Specialized ===
Here is the list of some important graduate textbooks that discuss particular physical areas of electromagnetism.

- Barut AO, Electrodynamics and Classical Theory of Fields and Particles, Dover, 1980. (Note: Reissue of the 1964 textbook published by Macmillan.)
- Baylis WE, Electrodynamics: A Modern Geometric Approach, Birkhäuser, 1999.
- Böttcher CJF, Bordewijk P, Van Belle OC, Rip A, Theory of Electric Polarization, 2nd ed, 2 vols, Elsevier, 1973, 1978. (Note: Volume 1: Dielectrics in Static Fields Volume 2: Dielectrics in Time-Dependent Fields)
- Clemmow PC, Dougherty JP, Electrodynamics of Particles and Plasmas, CRC, 2018. (Note: Reissue of the 1969 textbook published by Addison-Wesley.)
- Cullity DB, Stock SR, Elements of X-Ray Diffraction, 3rd ed, Pearson, 2014. (Note: Reissue of the 2001 textbook published by the same publisher.)
- Eringen AC, Maugin GA, Electrodynamics of Continua, 2 vols, Springer, 1990. (Note: Volume 1: Foundations and Solid Media Volume 2: Fluids and Complex Media)
- Ginzburg VL, The Propagation of Electromagnetic Waves in Plasmas, 2nd ed, Pergamon, 1970.
- Hehl FW, Obukhov YN, Foundations of Classical Electrodynamics: Charge, Flux, and Metric, Springer, 2003.
- Landau LD, Lifshitz EM, The Classical Theory of Fields, 4th ed, Pergamon, 1975. (Note: Second volume in the book series Landau and Lifshitz Course of Theoretical Physics.)
- Lechner K, Classical Electrodynamics: A Modern Perspective, Springer, 2018.
- Oppenheimer JR, Lectures on Electrodynamics, Gordon & Breach, 1970.
- Post EJ, Formal Structure of Electromagnetics: General Covariance and Electromagnetics, Dover, 1997. (Note: Reissue of the 1962 textbook published by North-Holland.)
- Rohrlich F, Classical Charged Particles, 3rd ed, World Scientific, 2007.
- Rybicki GB, Lightman AP, Radiative Processes in Astrophysics, Wiley, 1979.

== Electrical engineering ==
According to a 2011 review of analytical and computational textbooks in electromagnetism by David Davidson, Julius Stratton's Electromagnetic Theory remains the classic text in electromagnetism and is still regularly cited. (Note: Although Stratton's textbook originally published in 1941 and no further edition of it was ever published, but the textbook has accumulated more than 20000 citations in Google Scholar. "Electromagnetic Theory [Google Scholar]".) Davidson goes on to point out that Constantine Balanis' Advanced Engineering Electromagnetics and Roger Harrington's Time-Harmonic Electromagnetic Fields are standard references at the post-graduate level. Also for advanced undergraduate level, the textbook Fields and Waves in Communication Electronics by Simon Ramo, John Whinnery, and Theodore Van Duzer is considered as standard reference.

Many of the important and classic graduate electromagnetic textbooks related to electrical engineering listed here are published or reissued by IEEE under the name of The IEEE Press Series on Electromagnetic Wave Theory. (Note: Most of the books (not all of them) published in the series are available on web page IEEE Press Series on Electromagnetic Wave Theory in Wiley website.)

=== Undergraduate (introductory and intermediate) ===
- Cheng DK, Field and Wave Electromagnetics, 2nd ed, Addison-Wesley, 1989.
- Hammond P, Electromagnetism for Engineers: An Introductory Course, 4th ed, Oxford University, 1997.
- Haus HA, Melcher JR, Electromagnetic Fields and Energy, Prentice Hall, 1989.
- Hayt WH, Buck JA, Engineering Electromagnetics, 9th ed, McGraw Hill, 2018.
- Ida N, Engineering Electromagnetics, 4th ed, Springer, 2021.
- Johnk CTA, Engineering Electromagnetic Fields and Waves, 2nd ed, Wiley, 1991.
- Jordan EC, Balmain KG, Electromagnetic Waves and Radiating Systems, 2nd ed, Prentice Hall, 1968. (Note: This is an intermediate textbook also suitable for graduate studies.)
- Kraus JD, Fleisch DA, Russ SH, Electromagnetics with Applications, 5th ed, McGraw Hill, 1999.
- Lorrain P, Corson DR, Lorrain F, Electromagnetic Fields and Waves: Including Electric Circuits, 3rd ed, WH Freeman, 1988.
- Ramo S, Whinnery JR, Van Duzer T, Fields and Waves in Communication Electronics, 3rd ed, Wiley, 1994. (Note: Earlier editions published as: Fields and Waves in Modern Radio) (Note: This is an intermediate textbook also suitable for graduate studies.)
- Sadiku MNO, Elements of Electromagnetics, 7th ed, Oxford University, 2018.
- Strangeway RA, Holland SS, Richie JE, Electromagnetics and Transmission Lines: Essentials for Electrical Engineering, 2nd ed, Wiley, 2022.
- Ulaby FT, Ravaioli U, Fundamentals of Applied Electromagnetics, 8th ed, Pearson, 2020.

=== Graduate ===
- Balanis CA, Advanced Engineering Electromagnetics, 3rd ed, Wiley, 2024.
- Chew WC, Waves and Fields in Inhomogeneous Media, IEEE, 1995. (Note: IEEE classic reissue of the 1990 textbook published by Van Nostrand.)
- Collin RE, Field Theory of Guided Waves, 2nd ed, Wiley-IEEE, 1991.
- Felsen LB, Marcuvitz N, Radiation and Scattering of Waves, Wiley-IEEE, 2003. (Note: IEEE classic reissue of the 1973 textbook published by Prentice Hall.)
- Gonzalez, G, Advanced Electromagnetic Wave Propagation Methods, Taylor and Francis, 2022.
- Harrington RF, Time-Harmonic Electromagnetic Fields, Wiley-IEEE, 2001. (Note: IEEE classic reissue of the 1961 textbook published by McGraw Hill.)
- Ishimaru A, Electromagnetic Wave Propagation, Radiation, and Scattering: From Fundamentals to Applications, 2nd ed, Wiley-IEEE, 2017.
- Jones DS, The Theory of Electromagnetism, Pergamon, 1964.
- Kong JA, Electromagnetic Wave Theory, 3rd ed, EMW, 2008.
- Schelkunoff SA, Electromagnetic Waves, Van Nostrand, 1943.
- Smythe WR, Static and Dynamic Electricity, 3rd ed, Hemisphere, 1989. (Note: Reissue of the 1968 textbook published by McGraw Hill.) (Note: Although William Smythe was by training and profession a physicist, but he mentions in preface of the book: "...this book is written for the experimental research physicist and engineer rather than for the theoretical man." Smythe, W. R. (1989). Static and Dynamic Electricity (3 ed.). Hemisphere. p. xxiii. ISBN 0-89116-916-4. OSTI 6903398.)
- Stratton JA, Electromagnetic Theory, Wiley-IEEE, 2007. (Note: IEEE classic reissue of the 1941 textbook published by McGraw Hill.)
- Van Bladel J, Electromagnetic Fields, 2nd ed, Wiley-IEEE, 2007.

=== Specialized ===
- Beckmann P, Spizzichino A, The Scattering of Electromagnetic Waves from Rough Surfaces, Artech House, 1987. (Note: Reissue of the 1963 textbook published by Pergamon.)
- Dudley DG, Mathematical Foundations for Electromagnetic Theory, Wiley-IEEE, 1994.
- Hanson GW, Yakovlev AB, Operator Theory for Electromagnetics: An Introduction, Springer, 2002.
- Idemen MM, Discontinuities in the Electromagnetic Field, Wiley-IEEE, 2011.
- Ishimaru A, Wave Propagation and Scattering in Random Media, IEEE-Oxford University, 1997. (Note: IEEE classic reissue of the 1978 two volume textbook published by Academic.)
- Kazimierczuk MK, High-Frequency Magnetic Components, 2nd ed, Wiley, 2014.
- Lindell IV, Methods for Electromagnetic Field Analysis, 2nd ed, Wiley-IEEE, 1996.
- McNamara DA, Pistotius CWI, Malherbe JAG, Introduction to Uniform Geometrical Theory of Diffraction, Artech House, 1990.
- Mittra R, Lee SW, Analytical Techniques in the Theory of Guided Waves, Macmillan, 1971.
- Senior TBA, Volakis JL, Approximate Boundary Conditions in Electromagnetics, IEE 1995.
- Tai CT, Dyadic Green Functions in Electromagnetic Theory, 2nd ed, IEEE, 1994.
- Tsang L, Kong JA, Ding KH, Ao CO, Scattering of Electromagnetic Waves, 3 vols, Wiley, 2001. (Note: Volume 1: Theories and Applications Volume 2: Numerical Simulations Volume 3: Advanced Topics)
- Ufimtsev PY, Fundamentals of the Physical Theory of Diffraction, 2nd ed, Wiley-IEEE, 2014.
- Van Bladel J, Singular Electromagnetic Fields and Sources, Wiley-IEEE, 1991.
- Wait JR, Electromagnetic Waves in Stratified Media, 2nd ed, IEEE-Oxford University, 1996. (Note: IEEE classic reissue of the 1970 textbook published by Pergamon.)

=== Radio-frequency ===
- Balanis CA, Antenna Theory: Analysis and Design, 4th ed, Wiley, 2016.
- Collin RE, Foundations for Microwave Engineering, 2nd ed, Wiley-IEEE, 2001. (Note: IEEE classic reissue of the 1992 textbook published by McGraw Hill.)
- Elliott RS, Antenna Theory and Design, Wiley-IEEE, 2003. (Note: IEEE classic reissue of the 1981 textbook published by Prentice Hall.)
- Garg R, Bhartia P, Bahl I, Ittipiboon A, Microstrip Antenna Design Handbook, Artech House, 2001.
- Kraus JD, Marhefka RJ, Khan AS, Antennas and Wave Propagation, 5th ed, McGraw Hill, 2017.
- Marcuvitz N, Waveguide Handbook, IET, 2009. (Note: Reissue of the 1951 textbook published by McGraw Hill.)
- Milligan TA, Modern Antenna Design, 2nd ed, Wiley-IEEE 2005.
- Paul CR, Scully RC, Steffka MA, Introduction to Electromagnetic Compatibility, 3rd ed, Wiley, 2023.
- Pozar DM, Microwave Engineering, 4th ed, Wiley, 2012.
- Rizzi PA, Microwave Engineering: Passive Circuits, Prentice Hall, 1988.
- Ruck GT, Barrick DE, Stuart WD, Krichbaum CK, Radar Cross Section Handbook, 2 vols, Kluwer-Plenum, 1970.
- Stutzman WL, Thiele GA, Antenna Theory and Design, 3rd ed, Wiley, 2013.
- Tsang L, Kong JA, Shin RT, Theory of Microwave Remote Sensing, Wiley, 1985.
- Ulaby FT, Moore RK, Fung AK, Microwave Remote Sensing: Active and Passive, 3 vols, Artech House, 1981, 1982, 1986. (Note: Volume 1: Microwave Remote Sensing Fundamentals and Radiometry Volume 2: Radar Remote Sensing and Surface Scattering and Emission Theory Volume 3: From Theory to Applications)

=== Metamaterials ===
- Caloz C, Itoh T, Electromagnetic Metamaterials: Transmission Line Theory and Microwave Applications (The Engineering Approach), Wiley-IEEE, 2006.
- Capolino F, (Ed), Metamaterials Handbook, 2 vols, CRC, 2009. (Note: Volume 1: Theory and Phenomena of Metamaterials Volume 2: Applications of Metamaterials)
- Cui TJ, Smith DR, Liu R, (Eds), Metamaterials: Theory, Design, and Applications, Springer, 2010.
- Eleftheriades GV, Balmain KG, (Eds), Negative-Refraction Metamaterials: Fundamental Principles and Applications, Wiley-IEEE, 2005.
- Engheta N, Ziolkowski RW, (Eds), Metamaterials: Physics and Engineering Explorations, Wiley-IEEE, 2006.
- Marqués R, Martín F, Sorolla M, Metamaterials with Negative Parameters: Theory, Design, and Microwave Applications, Wiley, 2008.
- Munk BA, Frequency Selective Surfaces: Theory and Design, Wiley, 2000.
- Munk BA, Metamaterials: Critique and Alternatives, Wiley, 2009.
- Ramakrishna SA, Grzegorczyk TM, Physics and Applications of Negative Refractive Index Materials, CRC, 2008.
- Sarychev AK, Shalaev VM, Electrodynamics of Metamaterials, World Scientific, 2007.
- Tretyakov S, Analytical Modeling in Applied Electromagnetics, Artech House, 2003.
- Yang F, Rahmat-Samii Y, Electromagnetic Band Gap Structures in Antenna Engineering, Cambridge University, 2009.

=== Computational ===
- Booton RC, Computational Methods for Electromagnetics and Microwaves, Wiley, 1992.
- Chew WC, Jin JM, Michielssen E, Song J, (Eds), Fast and Efficient Algorithms in Computational Electromagnetics, Artech House, 2001.
- Gibson WC, The Method of Moments in Electromagnetics, 3rd ed, CRC, 2022.
- Harrington RF, Field Computation by Moment Methods, Wiley-IEEE, 2000. (Note: IEEE classic reissue of the 1968 textbook published by Macmillan.)
- Itoh T, (Ed), Numerical Techniques for Microwave and Millimeter-Wave Passive Structures, Wiley, 1989.
- Jin JM, The Finite Element Method in Electromagnetics, 3rd ed, Wiley-IEEE, 2014.
- Jones DS, Methods in Electromagnetic Wave Propagation, 2nd ed, Wiley-IEEE, 1994.
- Kunz KS, Luebbers RJ, The Finite Difference Time Domain Method for Electromagnetics, CRC, 1993.
- Peterson AF, Ray SL, Mittra R, Computational Methods for Electromagnetics, Wiley-IEEE, 1997.
- Sadiku MNO, Computational Electromagnetics with MATLAB, 4th ed, CRC, 2019. (Note: Earlier editions published as: Numerical Techniques in Electromagnetics Numerical Techniques in Electromagnetics with MATLAB)
- Silvester PP, Ferrari RL, Finite Elements for Electrical Engineers, 3rd ed, Cambridge University, 1996.
- Taflove A, Hagness SC, (Eds), Computational Electrodynamics: The Finite-Difference Time-Domain Method, 3rd ed, Artech House, 2005.

== Optics ==
There are also many outstanding and notable textbooks published in optics which is a branch of electromagnetism dealing with interactions of light or visible spectrum electromagnetism with matter. Here is the list of some important textbooks in different areas of classical optics. These textbooks are suitable for both physics and electrical engineering studies depending on the context.

=== Generic ===
- Born M, Wolf E, Principles of Optics, 7th ed, Cambridge University, 2019. (Note: Reissue of the 1999 textbook published by the same publisher.)
- Fowles GR, Introduction to Modern Optics, 2nd ed, Dover, 1989. (Note: Reissue of the 1975 textbook published by Holt McDougal.)
- Guenther BD, Modern Optics, 2nd ed, Oxford University, 2015.
- Hecht E, Optics, 5th ed, Pearson, 2017.
- Iizuka K, Engineering Optics, 4th ed, Springer, 2019.
- Jenkins FA, White HE, Fundamentals of Optics, 4th ed, McGraw Hill, 2001. (Note: Reissue of the 1976 textbook published by the same publisher.)
- Lipson A, Lipson SG, Lipson H, Optical Physics, 4th ed, Cambridge University, 2010.
- Shiell R, McNab I, Pedrottis' Introduction to Optics, 4th ed, Cambridge University, 2024.
- Smith WJ, Modern Optical Engineering: The Design of Optical Systems, 4th ed, McGraw Hill, 2008.
- Sommerfeld A, Optics, Academic, 1954. (Note: Fourth volume in the book series Sommerfeld Lectures on Theoretical Physics.)

=== Specialized ===
- Agrawal GP, Fiber-Optic Communication Systems, 5th ed, Wiley, 2021.
- Agrawal GP, Nonlinear Fiber Optics, 6th ed, Elsevier, 2019.
- Boyd RW, Nonlinear Optics, 4th ed, Elsevier, 2020.
- Goodman JW, Introduction to Fourier Optics, 4th ed, WH Freeman, 2017.
- Goodman JW, Statistical Optics, 2nd ed, Wiley, 2015.
- Haus HA, Waves and Fields in Optoelectronics, Prentice Hall, 1984.
- Luneburg RK, Mathematical Theory of Optics, University of California, 1964. (Note: Reissue of the 1944 textbook published by the Brown University.)
- Maier SA, Plasmonics: Fundamentals and Applications, Springer, 2007.
- Novotny L, Hecht B, Principles of Nano-Optics, 2nd ed, Cambridge University, 2012.
- Saleh BEA, Teich MC, Fundamentals of Photonics, 3rd ed, Wiley, 2019.
- Shen YR, Principles of Nonlinear Optics, Wiley, 1984.
- Yariv A, Yeh P, Photonics: Optical Electronics in Modern Communications, 6th ed, Oxford University, 2007. (Note: Earlier editions published as: Introduction to Optical Electronics Optical Electronics Optical Electronics in Modern Communications)

=== Light scattering ===
- Berne BJ, Pecora R, Dynamic Light Scattering: With Applications to Chemistry, Biology, and Physics, Dover, 2000. (Note: Reissue of the 1976 textbook published by Wiley.)
- Bohren CF, Huffman DR, Absorption and Scattering of Light by Small Particles, Wiley, 2004. (Note: Reissue of the 1983 textbook published by the same publisher.)
- Kerker M, The Scattering of Light and Other Electromagnetic Radiation, Academic, 1969.
- Mishchenko MI, Travis LD, Lacis AA, Scattering, Absorption, and Emission of Light by Small Particles, NASA-Cambridge University, 2006.
- van de Hulst HC, Light Scattering by Small Particles, Dover, 1981. (Note: Reissue of the 1957 textbook published by Wiley.)
- Yeh P, Optical Waves in Layered Media, Wiley, 1988.

== Magnetism ==
Another branch of electromagnetism that has been developed separately is magnetism, which is about studying magnetic properties of different materials and their interactions with electromagnetic fields. There are also many classic textbooks published in magnetism which some of them are listed here and they could be used in both physics and electrical engineering studies depending on the context.

- Aharoni A, Introduction to the Theory of Ferromagnetism, 2nd ed, Oxford University, 1996.
- Blundell S, Magnetism in Condensed Matter, Oxford University, 2001.
- Bozorth RM, Ferromagnetism, Wiley-IEEE, 2003. (Note: IEEE classic reissue of the 1951 textbook published by Van Nostrand.)
- Chikazumi S, Physics of Ferromagnetism, 2nd ed, Oxford University, 1997.
- Coey JMD, Magnetism and Magnetic Materials, Cambridge University, 2009.
- Cullity BD, Graham CD, Introduction to Magnetic Materials, 2nd ed, Wiley-IEEE, 2009.
- Dunlop DJ, Özdemir Ö, Rock Magnetism: Fundamentals and Frontiers, Cambridge University, 1997.
- Jiles D, Introduction to Magnetism and Magnetic Materials, 3rd ed, CRC, 2016.
- Krishnan KM, Fundamentals and Applications of Magnetic Materials, Oxford University, 2016.
- Morrish AH, The Physical Principles of Magnetism, Wiley-IEEE, 2001. (Note: IEEE classic reissue of the 1965 textbook published by Wiley.)
- O'handley RC, Modern Magnetic Materials: Principles and Applications, Wiley, 2000.
- Spaldin NA, Magnetic Materials: Fundamentals and Applications, 2nd ed, Cambridge University, 2010.

== Magnetohydrodynamics ==
Magnetohydrodynamics is an interdisciplinary branch of physics that uses continuum mechanics to describe the interaction of electromagnetic fields with fluids that are conductive. It combines classical electromagnetism with fluid mechanics by combination of Maxwell equations with Navier-Stokes equations. This relatively new branch of physics was first developed by Hannes Alfvén in a 1942 paper published in Nature titled Existence of Electromagnetic-Hydrodynamic Waves. In 1950 Alfvén published a textbook titled Cosmical Electrodynamics which considered as the seminal work in the field of magnetohydrodynamics. There are also two closely related fields to the traditional field of magnetohydrodynamics which are called electrohydrodynamics and ferrohydrodynamics. Electrohydrodynamics deals with interaction of electromagnetic fields with weakly conductive fluids and ferrohydrodynamics deals with interaction of electromagnetic fields with magnetic fluids. Today magnetohydrodynamics and its related fields have many applications in plasma physics, electrical engineering, mechanical engineering, astrophysics, geophysics and many other scientific branches. Here is the list of some important textbooks in different areas of electro-magneto-ferro-hydrodynamics.

- Alfvén H, Fälthammar CG, Cosmical Electrodynamics: Fundamental Principles, 2nd ed, Oxford University, 1963.
- Biskamp D, Magnetohydrodynamic Turbulence, Cambridge University, 2003.
- Biskamp D, Nonlinear Magnetohydrodynamics, Cambridge University, 1993.
- Blums E, Cebers A, Maiorov MM, Magnetic Fluids, De Gruyter, 1996.
- Castellanos A, (Ed), Electrohydrodynamics, Springer, 1998.
- Cowling TG, Magnetohydrodynamics, 2nd ed, Adam Hilger, 1976.
- Davidson PA, Introduction to Magnetohydrodynamics, 2nd ed, Cambridge University, 2017.
- Moreau R, Magnetohydrodynamics, Springer, 1990.
- Priest E, Magnetohydrodynamics of the Sun, Cambridge University, 2014. (Note: Rewritten edition of the 1982 author's textbook titled Solar Magnetohydrodynamics.)
- Priest E, Forbes T, Magnetic Reconnection: MHD Theory and Applications, Cambridge University, 2000.
- Roberts PH, An Introduction to Magnetohydrodynamics, Elsevier, 1967.
- Rosensweig RE, Ferrohydrodynamics, Dover, 2014. (Note: Reissue of the 1985 textbook published by Cambridge University.)
- Sutton GW, Sherman A, Engineering Magnetohydrodynamics, Dover, 2006. (Note: Reissue of the 1965 textbook published by McGraw Hill.)

== Historical ==
There are many important books in electromagnetism which are generally considered as historical classics and some of them are listed here.

- Abraham M, Becker R, The Classical Theory of Electricity and Magnetism, 8th ed, Blackie & Son, 1932.
- Green G, An Essay on the Application of Mathematical Analysis to the Theories of Electricity and Magnetism, T Wheelhouse, 1828.
- Heaviside O, Electromagnetic Theory, 3rd ed, 3 vols, The Electrician, 1893, 1899, 1912.
- Hertz H, Electric Waves: Being Researches on the Propagation of Electric Action with Finite Velocity through Space, Macmillan, 1893.
- Jeans JH, The Mathematical Theory of Electricity and Magnetism, 5th ed, Cambridge University, 1927.
- Macdonald HM, Electric Waves, Cambridge University, 1902.
- Maxwell JC, A Treatise on Electricity and Magnetism, 3rd ed, 2 vols, Clarendon, 1891.
- Planck M, Theory of Electricity and Magnetism, 2nd ed, Macmillan, 1932. (Note: Third volume in the book series Planck Introduction to Theoretical Physics.)
- Schott GA, Electromagnetic Radiation and the Mechanical Reactions Arising from It, Cambridge University, 1912.
- Thomson JJ, Elements of the Mathematical Theory of Electricity and Magnetism, 4th ed, Cambridge University, 1909.
- Whittaker ET, A History of the Theories of Aether and Electricity, 2nd ed, 2 vols, Thomas Nelson, 1951. (Note: Volume 1: The Classical Theories Volume 2: The Modern Theories) (Note: First edition published in 1910.)

== See also ==
- Maxwell's equations
- Classical electromagnetism and special relativity
- History of electromagnetism
- List of textbooks on classical mechanics and quantum mechanics
- List of textbooks in thermodynamics and statistical mechanics
- List of textbooks in general relativity
- List of textbooks in mathematical physics
- List of important publications in physics
