= Bathroom singing =

Social phenomenon

Bathroom singing, also known as singing in the bathroom, singing in the bath, or singing in the shower, is a widespread phenomenon. Many people sing in the bathroom because the hard wall surfaces, often tiles or wooden panels, and lack of soft furnishings create an aurally pleasing acoustic environment.

== Overview ==
The multiple reflections from walls enrich the sound of one's voice. Small dimensions and hard surfaces of a typical bathroom produce various kinds of standing waves, reverberation and echoes, giving the voice "fullness and depth."

This habit was reported by Ibn Khaldun in Chapter 1 of his Muqaddimah:

Likewise, when those who enjoy a hot bath inhale the air of the bath, so that the heat of the air enters their spirits and makes them hot, they are found to experience joy. It often happens that they start singing, as singing has its origin in gladness.

=== Usage ===
Some musicians have sought to take advantage of the unique acoustics of bathrooms. Jon Anderson of Yes had tiles installed in the studio to simulate the echo effect of one's vocals in a bathroom. Paul Simon wrote:

The main thing about playing the guitar, though, was that I was able to sit by myself and play and dream. And I was always happy doing that. I used to go off in the bathroom, because the bathroom had tiles, so it was a slight echo chamber. I'd turn on the faucet so that water would run – I like that sound, it's very soothing to me – and I'd play. In the dark. 'Hello darkness, my old friend / I've come to talk with you again.'

"Weird Al" Yankovic in 1979 recorded his first single, "My Bologna," in the bathroom across from the California Polytechnic State University student radio station where he was DJing at the time.

== See also ==
- Room modes
- Acoustic resonance
- Voice frequency

== Sources ==
- Jearl Walker, The Flying Circus of Physics, 1975.
