= Kouyoumdjian =

Kouyoumdjian or Kouyoumjian (Armenian: Գույումճեան, derived from Turkish "kuyumcu" [kuyum "jewel" + cu "agentive/profession suffix"], meaning "jeweller" or "goldsmith") is an Armenian surname. Notable people with the surname include:

- Dikran Sarkis Kouyoumdjian (1895–1956), later known as Michael Arlen, short story writer and novelist
- Juan Kouyoumdjian, Argentine naval architect
- Ohannes Kouyoumdjian (1852–1933), Ottoman Armenian official
- Robert Kouyoumjian (1923–2011), American electrical engineer
- Zaven Kouyoumdjian (born 1970), Lebanese talk show host
