= Sadiku =

- Gender: Male

Origin
- Word/name: Arab
- Meaning: loyal, faithful

listen

Sadiku is a surname used in Albania, Kosovo, and Nigeria, derived from the Arabic name Sadiq, meaning "loyal, faithful." Notable people with the surname include:

- Armando Sadiku (born 1991), Albanian footballer
- Elena Sadiku (born 1993), Kosovar footballer
- Loret Sadiku (born 1991), Albanian footballer
- Orget Sadiku, Albanian composer
- Matthew Olanipekun Sadiku, American engineer
- Sadiku (Boko Haram), Nigerian Islamist leader
