= Satish K. Sharma =

Satish Kumar Sharma is a professor of Electrical and Computer Engineering and the director of the Antenna and Microwave Laboratory (AML) at San Diego State University (SDSU).

He received the SDSU Outstanding Faculty Award in 2017, the IEEE AP-S Harold A. Wheeler Prize Paper Award in 2015, and the National Science Foundation CAREER Award in 2009.

He co-edited three volumes of the Handbook of Reflector Antennas and Feed Systems, including Volume I: Theory and Design of Reflectors, Volume II: Feed Systems, and Volume III: Applications of Reflectors published by Artech House (2013). He also published a co-authored book Multifunctional Antennas and Arrays for Wireless Communication Systems (IEEE-Press/Wiley-InterScience, 2021)". He is a well-known expert in antenna engineering and has designed and developed antennas for wireless and satellite communications and radar applications.
