= Li Xiangheng =

Chinese politician

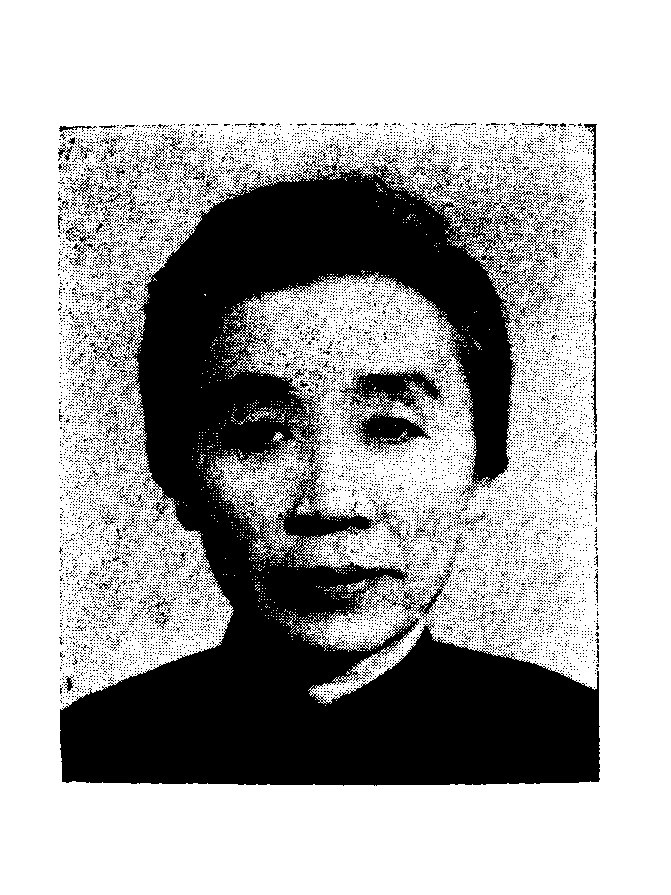

Member of the Legislative Yuan
- In office 1948–1966
- Constituency: Jilin

Personal details
- Born: 1900
- Died: 10 August 1966 (aged 65–66)

Li Xiangheng (Chinese: 李薌蘅, 1900 – 10 August 1966) was a Chinese politician. She was among the first group of women elected to the Legislative Yuan in 1948.

== Biography ==
Li was born Li Xiulan, later changing her name to Xiangheng because it had less common characters. She attended National Peking Women's Normal University, where she majored in music and physical education. During her time there she married Zhang Shenfu, a geologist and mining engineer, in an arranged marriage. Three days after their wedding he moved to the United States for work, and they remained apart for seven years as her father did not think it appropriate for women to leave the country. After graduating, she became a teacher at Jilin Girls' Normal School. She was later appointed dean of Jilin Girls' Middle School and headmistress of Harbin No.1 Girls' High School. Zhang returned to China in 1927, and the couple's first child was born in Harbin. After the Mukden Incident, the couple left what became Manchukuo, and moved between different mining towns in Henan, Sichuan and Hunan. By 1945 they were living in Chongqing. Zhang was killed in 1946 during a visit to Fushun to take over a coal mine from Soviet troops; the killing (which became known as the 'Zhang Shenfu incident') provoked anti-Soviet protests.

After Zhang's death, Li established a coal distribution company and in 1947 moved to Beijing. She was a delegate to the 1946 Constituent National Assembly that drew up the constitution of the Republic of China. In the 1948 elections to the Legislative Yuan she ran as a Kuomintang candidate in Jilin Province and was elected to parliament. She relocated to Taiwan during the Chinese Civil War, where she remained a member until her death of emphysema in 1966. Her son Leroy Chang emigrated to the United States, where his daughter Leslie T. Chang became a writer.
