= Jearl =

Jearl is a given name. Notable people with the name include:

- Jearl Margaritha (born 2000), Dutch footballer
- Jearl Miles Clark (born 1966), American athlete
- Jearl Walker (born 1945), American physicist
