= Hui Liu =

Chinese engineer and inventor

- Education: Fudan University; Portland State University; University of Texas
- Scientific career
- Fields: Electrical engineering
- Workplaces: University of Virginia; University of Washington; Shanghai Jiao Tong University

Dr. Hui Liu is an American scholar and an entrepreneur in the field of wireless and satellite communications. He has authored or co-authored more than 200 scholarly articles and 2 textbooks, and holds 67 awarded patents in areas ranging from wireless systems, signal processing, satellite networks, to machine learning. He has more than 17,000 paper citations and an H-index of 66 as of 2025. Dr. Liu is also one of the principal designers of three industrial standards on cellular networks, terrestrial broadcasting, and satellite communications, respectively.

== Biography ==
Liu graduated from Fudan University of Shanghai, China with B.Sc degree in electrical engineering in 1988 and obtained master's degree at Portland State University. By 1995 he completed his Ph.D. in the same field as well from the University of Texas at Austin. From September of the same year till July 1998 Liu worked at the University of Virginia as a tenure-track assistant professor. After that, he joined the Electrical Engineering department of University of Washington where he became a tenured Full Professor and the Associate Chair of Research. From 2013 to 2016, he was the ZhiYuan Chair Professor and the Associate Dean at School of Electronic, Information & Electrical Engineering (SEIEE) at Shanghai Jiao Tong University. He worked as a chief scientist at Cwill Telecom and was one of the principal designers of the 3G TD-SCDMA technologies. He founded Adaptix in 2000 and pioneered the development of OFDMA-based mobile broadband cellular networks (mobile WiMAX and 4G LTE). He is the President and CTO of Astrum Mobile, a Singapore-based satellite-to-device (S2D) multicast/broadcast company.

== Inventor ==
- Dr. Liu is the Architect of the mobile terrestrial broadcasting technology in the Converged Multimedia Mobile Broadcasting (CMMB) networks
- He is the author of the 6 original patents on TD-SCDMA, one of the ITU standards on mobile cellular networks. He won the Gold Prize Patent Award for his patent on "Smart Antenna CDMA Wireless Communication Systems," U. S. Patent 6,122,260.
- He developed the world first OFDMA-based broadband mobile network (Adaptix Inc.) - OFDMA now becomes the multiple-access of choice in WiMAX and 4G/5G; Dr. Liu is recognized in IEEE Spectrum, September 2005 as the Pioneer in Mobile WiMAX
- Dr. Liu is the co-founder and CTO of Astrum Mobile, developing the world's first satellite-to-device (S2D) multimedia broadcast network that delivers rich media including video, audio entertainment and data services to phones, vehicles and mobile devices that is data-free, abundant, and ubiquitous.

== Awards ==
In 1997 the National Science Foundation awarded Liu with the NSF Early Faculty CAREER Award; In 2000 he became a recipient of the Young Investigator Award from the Office of Naval Research. During the same year, with the help of Artech House he published his Signal Processing Applications in CDMA Communications book and five years later published another one which was called OFDM-Based Broadband Wireless Networks – Design and Optimization. Before he published his second book through Wiley he was twice nominated for the IEEE Best Paper Award and became the recipient of the Gold Prize Patent Award for his patent on 3G TD-SCDMA . Liu has received multiple IEEE Best Conference Paper Award and is recognized in IEEE Spectrum, September 2005 as the Pioneer in Mobile WiMAX; In 2008 he was honored to be an IEEE Fellow "for contributions to global standards for broadband cellular and mobile broadcasting".
