= David Halliday =

David Halliday may refer to:

- Dave Halliday, Scottish professional footballer (1901–1970)
- David Halliday (physicist), American physicist and textbook author (1916–2010)

== See also ==
- David Hallyday, French musician, actor, and car racer (born 1966)
