= Olanipekun =

- Gender: Male
- Language: Yoruba

Origin
- Origin: Nigeria
- Meaning: Wealth has no limitation
- Region of origin: South-west Nigeria

Olanipekun audio is a Yoruba surname common in Nigeria, meaning "Wealth has no limitation". Olanipekun is a traditional name of Yoruba origin. As a given name it is less common, and can be used for both males and females.

== Notable people with the surname ==
- Matthew Olanipekun Sadiku, American electrical engineer
- Nelson Olanipekun, Nigerian human rights lawyer
- Wole Olanipekun, Nigerian jurist
