= Douglas Jones (mathematician) =

British mathematician

Professor Douglas Jones MBE FRS FRSE

Ivory Professor of Mathematics, Queen's College, Dundee/University of Dundee
- In office 1965–1992

Professor of Mathematics, University College of North Staffordshire/University of Keele
- In office 1957–1964

Personal details
- Born: Douglas Samuel Jones; 10 January 1922 Corby, Northamptonshire, England
- Died: 29 November 2013 (aged 91)

Douglas Samuel Jones (10 January 1922 – 29 November 2013) was a mathematician and electrical engineer known for his works in the field of electromagnetism.

He was described by The Scotsman as "one of the most outstanding British mathematicians of his generation".

== Life ==
Jones was born 10 January 1922 in Corby Northamptonshire, and was educated at Wolverhampton Grammar School. He was the eldest of four children.

In his spare time, Jones was known to enjoy golf, walking and photography. He and his wife Ivy had two children.

== Career ==
In 1940, Jones began studying electrical engineering at Clarendon Laboratory of the Corpus Christi College, Oxford University.

Jones joined the RAF in 1942 and graduated MA in applied mathematics from Oxford in 1947. He then went to Massachusetts Institute of Technology to study electrical engineering, but switched to physics, studying under Victor Weisskopf, Herman Feshbach, and Robley Evans. In the same years he led a research team looking at equipment for night fighter operations. Awarded MBE in 1945 for his work with the RAF.

Jones then worked as a lecturer at Manchester University. In 1957 he was appointed chair of Mathematics at the University of Keele.

During his time at Keele, Jones wrote the book The Theory of Electromagnetism in 1964 which established him as a leader in this field.

In 1965, Jones was appointed to the Ivory Chair of Applied Mathematics at Queen's College, Dundee, then part of the University of St Andrews, but which became the University of Dundee in 1967.

Jones retired from the University of Dundee in 1992, gaining the title Emeritus Professor.

== Honours and awards ==
- 1945: Awarded Most Excellent Order of the British Empire
- 1964: Fellow of the Institute of Mathematics and its Applications
- 1967: Elected Fellow of the Royal Society of Edinburgh
- 1968: Elected Fellow of the Royal Society
- 1973: Awarded Keith Medal of the Royal Society of Edinburgh
- 1975: Awarded Honorary Doctor of Science by the University of Strathclyde
- 1975: Awarded Marconi Prize by the Institution of Electrical Engineers
- 1980: Elected Honorary Fellow of Corpus Christi College
- 1981: Awarded van der Pol Gold Medal of the International Union of Radio Science
- 1986: Awarded Naylor Prize and Lectureship of the London Mathematical Society
- 1989: Fellow of the Institution of Electrical Engineers
- 2013: Life member of the Institute of Electrical and Electronics Engineers

== Publications ==
- Electrical and Mechanical Oscillations (1961)
- Theory of Electromagnetism (1964)
- Generalised Functions (1966)
- Introductory Analysis (vol. 1, 1969; vol 2, 1970)
- Methods in Electromagnetic Wave Propagation (1979, 2nd edn 1994)
- Elementary Information Theory (1979)
- The Theory of Generalised Functions (1982)
- Differential Equations and Mathematical Biology (1983, 3rd edn 2010)
- Acoustic and Electromagnetic Waves (1986)
- Assembly Programming and the 8086 Microprocessor (1988)
- 80×86 Assembly Programming (1991)
- Introduction to Asymptotics (1997)

== See also ==
- List of textbooks in electromagnetism
