= Eyvind Wichmann =

American theoretical physicist (1928–2019)

- Born: May 30, 1928; Stockholm, Sweden
- Died: February 16, 2019 (aged 90); Berkeley, California, U.S.
- Education: Columbia University (PhD)
- Known for: Bisognano–Wichmann Theorem; Cluster decomposition
- Spouse: Marianne Paischeff Wichmann (m. 1951; died 2003)
- Children: Mats Wichmann; Sonia Wichmann
- Scientific career
- Fields: Theoretical physics
- Workplaces: University of California, Berkeley
- Thesis: Vacuum Polarization in Strong Coulomb Fields (1956)
- Doctoral advisor: Norman Kroll
- Doctoral students: Leonard Mlodinow

Eyvind Hugo Wichmann (May 30, 1928 – February 16, 2019) was an American theoretical physicist.

== Life ==
Wichmann studied in Finland (Institute of Technology, Helsinki, diploma 1950) and finished his master studies 1953 at the Columbia University, following that with his PhD 1956. From 1955 to 1957 he was at the Institute for Advanced Study. In 1957 he became assistant professor and 1967 professor for physics at the University of California, Berkeley. Emeritus since 1993.

His research covers quantum field theory and quantum electrodynamics (both concrete problems of particle physics as well as axiomatic quantum field theory, in which he, in 1975, made the connection to the Tomita–Takesaki theory). He is well known as the author of the book on quantum physics in the Berkeley Physics Course.

He was a member of the Finnish Academy of Science and Letters and a Fellow of the American Physical Society. From 1961 to 1963 he was a Sloan Research Fellow.

== Publications ==
- Quantum Physics. Berkeley Physics Course, volume 4, McGraw Hill, 1971.
- Wichmann, Eyvind H; Kroll, Norman M. (January 15, 1956). "Vacuum Polarization in a Strong Coulomb Field". Phys. Rev. 101 (2): 843. Bibcode:1956PhRv..101..843W. doi:10.1103/PhysRev.101.843.
