= Electricity and Magnetism (book) =

Edward M. Purcell's 1965 Electromagnetism textbook

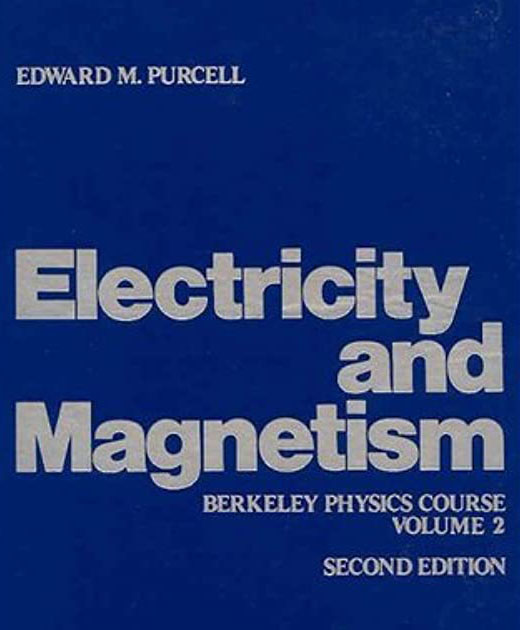
- Cover of the 2nd edition of the book, published in 1985
- Author: Edward Mills Purcell
- Language: English
- Subject: Physics (electromagnetism)
- Genre: Textbook
- Publication date: 1st: 1965; 2nd: 1985; 3rd: 2013
- Publication place: United States of America
- Pages: xxii + 839 + 2

Electricity and Magnetism is a standard textbook in electromagnetism originally written by Nobel laureate Edward Mills Purcell in 1963. Along with David Griffiths' Introduction to Electrodynamics, this book is one of the most widely adopted undergraduate textbooks in electromagnetism. A Sputnik-era project funded by the National Science Foundation grant, the book is influential for its use of relativity in the presentation of the subject at the undergraduate level. In 1999, it was noted by Norman Foster Ramsey Jr. that the book was widely adopted and has many foreign translations.

The 1965 edition, now supposed to be freely available due to a condition of the federal grant, was originally published as a volume of the Berkeley Physics Course (see below for more on the legal status). The third edition, released in 2013, was written by David J. Morin for Cambridge University Press and included the adoption of SI units.

== Background ==
The Berkeley Series was influenced by MIT's Physical Science Study Committee that was formed shortly before Sputnik was launched in 1956. The satellite could be seen from rooftops at MIT with times published in the local Boston newspapers. The space race caused a shake-up in the US scientific establishment and it led to new approaches to science education in the US.

== Contents (3rd edition) ==
1. Electrostatics: charges and fields
2. The electric potential
3. Electric fields around conductors
4. Electric currents
5. The fields of moving charges
6. The magnetic field
7. Electromagnetic induction
8. Alternating-current circuits
9. Maxwell's equations and electromagnetic waves
10. Electric fields in matter
11. Magnetic fields in matter

== Reception ==
In 1966, Benjamin F. Bayman reviewed the first edition. Bayman both commended and criticized the book. He questioned whether the book is appropriate for college sophomores to read, and commended the book, calling it a "beautiful book on electricity and magnetism." Bayman highlights the chapters that deal with magnetic and electric fields in matter.

According to a 1998 review of the second edition, the first edition "has not aged" and continued to be a fine introduction for undergraduates. The reviewer points out that the Berkeley Physics Series limitations and the book's dearth of references to wave phenomena are its two biggest issues. The review states that the "results are spectacular" and that problems were resolved in the latest edition.

The main criticism of the book, according to a 2012 review of a second edition, is that it doesn't provide answers for the problems that are presented at the conclusion of each chapter. The reviewer notes that the lack of many calculation examples in the text made this issue worse. Another issue raised was the book's usage of cgs units rather than SI units. The review continues, stating that "despite the criticism, this text is very beautifully written and gives a well-structured and clear insight into the topic" and "can be recommended to any student" for use in an introductory course on electromagnetism.

Norman Foster Ramsey Jr. called it an "excellent introductory textbook" in his 1999 obituary for Purcell. Roy Schwitters writes in a Physics Today review of Andrew Zangwill's Modern Electrodynamics that he advises undergraduates to pick up the third edition of this book. Jermey N. A. Mathews listed it as one of the five books that stood out in Physics Today in 2013, acknowledging that there were issues with the previous writings, however, the publication noted that "clearly, Purcell's E&M matures slowly."

In 2013, Michael Belsley noted that the third edition of the textbook was a significant improvement, especially appreciating its treatment of magnetism as a relativistic phenomenon. The 2013 book Conquering the Physics GRE described the third edition as an elegant introduction that emphasizes physical concepts over mathematical formalism. Sam Nolan praised it as an excellent updated introduction to the classic 50-year-old text. Another review referred to the third edition as a welcome update to the original work. Another review referred to the third edition as a welcome update to the original work.

== Legal status ==
Because it was funded by the National Science Foundation, the original editions of the Berkeley Physics Series contained notices on their copyright pages stating that the books were to be available royalty-free in five years. The copyright page of the original 1965 edition of Electricity and Magnetism includes a notice stating that it is available for use by authors and publishers on a royalty-free basis after 1970. The authors got lump-sum payments but did not receive royalties. The copyright page of the 1965 edition says to obtain a royalty-free license from Education Development Center.

Copyright © 1963, 1964, 1965 by Education Development Center, Inc. (successor by merger to Education Services Incorporated).

...
Education Development Center, Inc., Newton, Massachusetts
...
The copyright owner will give permission for the use of the original work in the English language after January 1, 1975. For conditions of use, permission to use, and for other permissions, apply to the copyright owner.

— Tata McGraw-Hill edition

Education Development Center's copyright to the 1965 edition now belongs to Edward Mills Purcell's sons, Dennis W. Purcell and Frank B. Purcell

Benjamin Crowell, a retired Fullerton College physics teacher, wrote that Cambridge University Press refused to provide him the contact information for the copyright owner, but instead forwarded the request to the copyright owner. Crowell wrote that this made it effectively impossible to obtain the royalty-free license promised under the original government contract and that this uncertainty places an open-source version of the first edition in legal limbo.

The reporting of the Electricity and Magnetism Open Access book project refers to electronic versions of the royalty-free first edition currently available on the internet.

== Original publication history ==
- Purcell, Edward M. (1965). Electricity and Magnetism (1st ed.). New York: McGraw-Hill. ISBN 978-0-07-004859-1 – via archive.org.
- Purcell, Edward M. (1966). Solutions Manual to Accompany Electricity and Magnetism: Berkeley Physics Course, Volume 2, First Edition. McGraw-Hill.
- Purcell, Edward M. (1985). Electricity and magnetism (2nd ed.). McGraw Hill. ISBN 978-0-07-004908-6.
- Purcell, Edward M. (1985). Solutions Manual to Accompany Electricity and Magnetism: Berkeley Physics Course, Volume 2, Second Edition. McGraw-Hill.
- Purcell, Edward M.; Morin, David J. (2013). Electricity and Magnetism (3rd ed.). Cambridge University Press. ISBN 978-1-107-01402-2.

== International editions ==
- Purcell, Edward M. (1989). Elektrizität und Magnetismus : Edward M. Purcell. [Übers. aus dem Amerikan. von Eike Gerstenhauer] (in German). Gerstenhauer, Eike., Kittel, Charles. (4., neubearb. Aufl ed.). Braunschweig: Vieweg. ISBN 3-528-38352-6. OCLC 60440819.

== See also ==
- List of textbooks in electromagnetism
