= Robert Kouyoumjian =

American electrical engineer and academic

Robert Gordon Kouyoumjian
- Born: April 26, 1923; Cleveland, Ohio, U.S.
- Died: January 3, 2011 (aged 87); Columbus, Ohio, U.S.
- Education: Ohio State University
- Known for: Uniform theory of diffraction
- Awards: IEEE Centennial Medal (1984); National Academy of Engineering membership (1995)
- Scientific career
- Fields: Electrical engineering
- Workplaces: Ohio State University
- Thesis: The calculation of the echo areas of perfectly conducting objects by the variational method (1953)
- Doctoral advisor: Victor H. Rumsey
- Doctoral students: Ben Munk; Raphael Tsu

Robert Gordon Kouyoumjian (April 26, 1923 – January 3, 2011) was an American electrical engineer and physicist who was a professor emeritus at the Department of Electrical Engineering at Ohio State University. He is best known for the development uniform theory of diffraction with his doctoral student Prabhakar Pathak.

== Biography ==
Robert Gordon Kouyoumjian was born on April 26, 1923, in Cleveland, Ohio. During World War II, he served in the United States Army Air Forces as a captain, and was trained in meteorology. Attending electronics lectures at Harvard University and Massachusetts Institute of Technology, he was involved early development of radar meteorology during this period. After the war, he completed his undergraduate education at Ohio State University, receiving a degree in engineering physics in 1948. He subsequently completed his doctoral studies under Victor H. Rumsey, receiving a PhD degree in physics in 1953 from Ohio State University. In the following year, he joined the faculty of the Department of Electrical Engineering at the same institution. He was promoted to full professorship in 1962 and retired in 1982 becoming a professor emeritus. While he remained active as an instructor for some years following his retirement, he continued his research work almost until the end of his life. He died on January 3, 2011, and was survived by three children and four grandhcildren.

Kouyoumjian's early work during the 1950s involved the development of variational solutions for certain classes of electromagnetic problems, which went on the become early forerunners for method of moments. His other work during this period also featured the areas of radar cross sections, antenna polarization analysis, thermal properties of electromagnetic waves, and underwater acoustics. During the 1960s, his work gravitated towards asymptotic high-frequency methods, and he sought to extend the geometrical theory of diffraction, developed by Joseph Keller. Following a series of works on the topic with multiple doctoral students, he introduced the uniform theory of diffraction with his doctoral student Prabhakar Pathak in the 1970s. The theory was subsequently used in the analysis of various electrically large radiation and scattering problems in engineering, such as indoor and outdoor radio propagation. In 1995, he was elected to the National Academy of Engineering, "for contributions to the development of the uniform geometric theory of diffraction and the analysis and design of antennas and scatterers." He has received IEEE Centennial Medal in 1984, Antennas and Propagation Society Distinguished Achievement Award in 1999, and the IEEE Third Millennium Medal in 2000. He was a member of the Commission B of the International Union of Radio Science.

== Selected publications ==
Book chapters

- Kouyoumjian, R. G. (2005). "The geometrical theory of diffraction and its application". In Mittra, Raj (ed.). Numerical and Asymptotic Techniques in Electromagnetics. Springer. pp. 165–215. ISBN 9783540070726.

Journal articles

- Kouyoumjian, R.G. (August 1965). "Asymptotic high-frequency methods". Proceedings of the IEEE. 53 (8): 864–876. Bibcode:1965IEEEP..53..864K. doi:10.1109/PROC.1965.4065.
- Ott, R. H.; Kouyoumjian, R. G.; Peters, L. (November 1967). "Scattering by a two-dimensional periodic array of narrow plates". Radio Science. 2 (11): 1347–1359. Bibcode:1967RaSc....2.1347O. doi:10.1002/rds19672111347.
- Pathak, P. H.; Kouyoumjian, R. G. (November 1974). "An analysis of the radiation from apertures in curved surfaces by the geometrical theory of diffraction". Proceedings of the IEEE. 62 (11): 1438–1447. Bibcode:1974IEEEP..62.1438P. doi:10.1109/PROC.1974.9650.
- Kouyoumjian, R. G.; Pathak, P. H. (November 1974). "A uniform geometrical theory of diffraction for an edge in a perfectly conducting surface". Proceedings of the IEEE. 62 (11): 1448–1461. Bibcode:1974IEEEP..62.1448K. doi:10.1109/PROC.1974.9651.
- Pathak, P.; Wang, Nan; Burnside, W.; Kouyoumjian, R. (July 1981). "A uniform GTD solution for the radiation from sources on a convex surface". IEEE Transactions on Antennas and Propagation. 29 (4): 609–622. Bibcode:1981ITAP...29..609P. doi:10.1109/TAP.1981.1142636.
- Tiberio, R.; Kouyoumjian, R. G. (1982). "An analysis of diffraction at edges illuminated by transition region fields". Radio Science. 17 (2): 323–336. Bibcode:1982RaSc...17..323T. doi:10.1029/RS017i002p00323.
- Zhang, Y. P.; Hwang, Y.; Kouyoumjian, R.G. (September 1998). "Ray-optical prediction of radio-wave propagation characteristics in tunnel environments. 1. Theory". IEEE Transactions on Antennas and Propagation. 46 (9): 1328–1336. Bibcode:1998ITAP...46.1328H. doi:10.1109/8.719976. hdl:10220/6306.
- Zhang, Y. P.; Hwang, Y.; Kouyoumjian, R.G. (September 1998). "Ray-optical prediction of radio-wave propagation characteristics in tunnel environments. 2. Analysis and measurements". IEEE Transactions on Antennas and Propagation. 46 (9): 1337–1345. Bibcode:1998ITAP...46.1337Z. doi:10.1109/8.719977. hdl:10220/5945.
