= Uniform theory of diffraction =

In numerical analysis, the uniform theory of diffraction (UTD) is a high-frequency method for solving electromagnetic scattering problems from electrically small discontinuities or discontinuities in more than one dimension at the same point. UTD is an extension of Joseph Keller's geometrical theory of diffraction (GTD) and was introduced by Robert Kouyoumjian and Prabhakar Pathak in 1974.

The uniform theory of diffraction approximates near field electromagnetic fields as quasi optical and uses knife-edge diffraction to determine diffraction coefficients for each diffracting object-source combination. These coefficients are then used to calculate the field strength and phase for each direction away from the diffracting point. These fields are then added to the incident fields and reflected fields to obtain a total solution.

== See also ==
- Electromagnetic modeling
- Biot–Tolstoy–Medwin diffraction model
- Keller cone
