= John Wheatley (physicist) =

American experimental physicist

- Born: 17 February 1927
- Died: 10 May 1986 (aged 59); Los Angeles, California, US
- Education: University of Colorado; University of Pittsburgh
- Scientific career
- Fields: experimental physics
- Doctoral advisor: David Halliday

John Charles Wheatley (17 February 1927, Tucson – 10 May 1986, Los Angeles) was an American experimental physicist who worked on quantum fluids at low and very low temperatures.

== Biography ==
Wheatley received his B.S. in electrical engineering in 1947 from the University of Colorado in Boulder and his Ph.D. in physics under David Halliday in 1952 from the University of Pittsburgh. From 1952 to 1966 he was an instructor and then a professor at the University of Illinois, Urbana-Champaign. In 1966 he became a full professor in the physics department of the University of California, San Diego. From 1981 to 1985 he did research at Los Alamos National Laboratory as a permanent staff member of the Laboratory. From 1985 he was a professor at the UCLA. He died of a heart attack while riding a bicycle.

His fame stems from his research on liquid helium-3, a Fermi liquid. He collaborated with theorists such as John Bardeen, Gordon Baym, and Christopher Pethick. In the academic years 1954/55 and 1980/81 he was a Guggenheim Fellow at the University of Leiden. He was elected a Fellow of the American Physical Society in 1961. He was a Sloan Fellow. In 1965/66 he was a guest scientist at the Center for Advanced Study of the University of Illinois in Urbana-Champaign. He was also a guest scientist for 18 months in 1962/63 at Bariloche Atomic Centre in Argentina, where he helped to establish a low temperature laboratory. At the time of his death he had been nominated for UCLA's first Presidential Chair in Physics. In 1975 Wheatley won the Fritz London Memorial Prize and in 1966 the Simon Memorial Prize. He was elected a member of the National Academy of Sciences in 1975 and he was also a member of the Finnish Academy of Sciences. In 1991 the John Wheatley Award was established in his honor.

He had a wife and two sons.

== SHE Corporation ==
In 1970 Wheatley founded the SHE (for Superconducting Helium Electronics) Corporation in San Diego with Olli Lounasmaa and other colleagues. SHE was the first worldwide corporation specializing in superconducting electronics. The name of the corporation was changed to Biomagnetic Technologies, Inc. (BTi) in 1985, and in December 1999, BTi merged with the Finnish company Neuromag Oy to form the new corporation 4-D Neuroimaging. The Neuromag part of the company was sold to Elekta AB of Sweden in 2003; 4-D Neuroimaging filed for bankruptcy in 2009.
