= Craig Bohren =

American atmospheric scientist and physicist

Craig F. Bohren (born 1940) is an American atmospheric scientist and physicist, who is a Distinguished Professor Emeritus of Meteorology at Pennsylvania State University. He is known for his fundamental textbooks on light scattering, atmospheric thermodynamics, and radiative transfer, as well as for his popular science books on atmospheric optics. He is an author of about 100 articles mostly on atmospheric optics, radiative transfer, and light scattering. His first atmospheric radiation teacher was Bruce Barkstrom. He is married to Nanette Malott Bohren.

== Education ==
Bohren earned his B.S. degree in mechanical engineering from San Jose State University in 1963. He earned an M.S. degree in nuclear engineering in 1966, an M.S. degree in physics in 1971, and a Ph.D. in physics in 1975, all from the University of Arizona.

== Awards and honors ==
- In 1988, Bohren was elected as a fellow of the Optical Society of America.
- In 1993, Bohren was selected to become a Selby Fellow of the Australian Academy of Science.

== See also ==
- List of textbooks in electromagnetism
