= David M. Pozar =

American engineer

- Born: David Michael Pozar; January 25, 1952 (age 74); Pittsburgh, Pennsylvania, U.S.
- Education: University of Akron; Ohio State University
- Awards: Issac Koga Gold Medal Award (1987); H. A. Wheeler Applications Prize Paper Award (1998); IEEE Third Millennium Medal (2000); S. A. Schelkunoff Transactions Prize Paper Award (2003)
- Scientific career
- Fields: Electrical engineering; Microwave engineering; Antenna theory
- Workplaces: University of Massachusetts Amherst
- Thesis: On moment method solutions for plate and wire geometries (1980)
- Doctoral advisor: Carlton H. Walter
- Website: ece.umass.edu/faculty/david-pozar

David Michael Pozar (born January 25, 1952) is an American electrical engineer, educator and professor emeritus at the Department of Electrical and Computer Engineering at University of Massachusetts Amherst. His research interests concentrate mainly on antenna theory and design. Pozar is also the author of the textbook, Microwave Engineering.

== Biography ==
David Michael Pozar was born on January 25, 1952, in Pittsburgh, Pennsylvania. He obtained his B.S. and M.S. degrees in electrical engineering from University of Akron in 1975 and 1976, respectively. He completed his PhD. studies under the supervision of Carlton H. Walter in 1980 at Ohio State University.

Pozar joined the Department of Electrical and Computer Engineering at University of Massachusetts Amherst in 1980; he was promoted to full professorship in 1989. In 1988, he worked at École Polytechnique Fédérale de Lausanne as a visiting professor during a sabbatical leave. He served as the associate editor of IEEE Transactions on Antennas and Propagation in between 1983 and 1986, as well as between 1989 and 1992. He became a Distinguished Lecturer for the IEEE Antennas and Propagation Society in 1993 and retired from the University in 2004. He is an IEEE Life Fellow, and he received the Distinguished Achievement Award from the IEEE Antennas and Propagation Society in 2020.

Pozar's research interests focus primarily on the design and analysis of microstrip antennas and phased arrays. He has authored multiple books on antenna and microwave engineering, including Antenna Design Using Personal Computers (1985), Microwave Engineering (1990) and Microwave and RF Design of Wireless Systems (2000). Pozar introduced the widely-used printed antenna feed techniques of aperture coupling in 1984 and proximity coupling in 1987. He is also the author of PCAAD, computer-aided design package for antennas. He also developed the first reflectarray antenna using microstrip patches of variable size, a design that has seen application throughout the world, including a reflectarray antenna used on a CubeSat satellite in orbit around Mars.

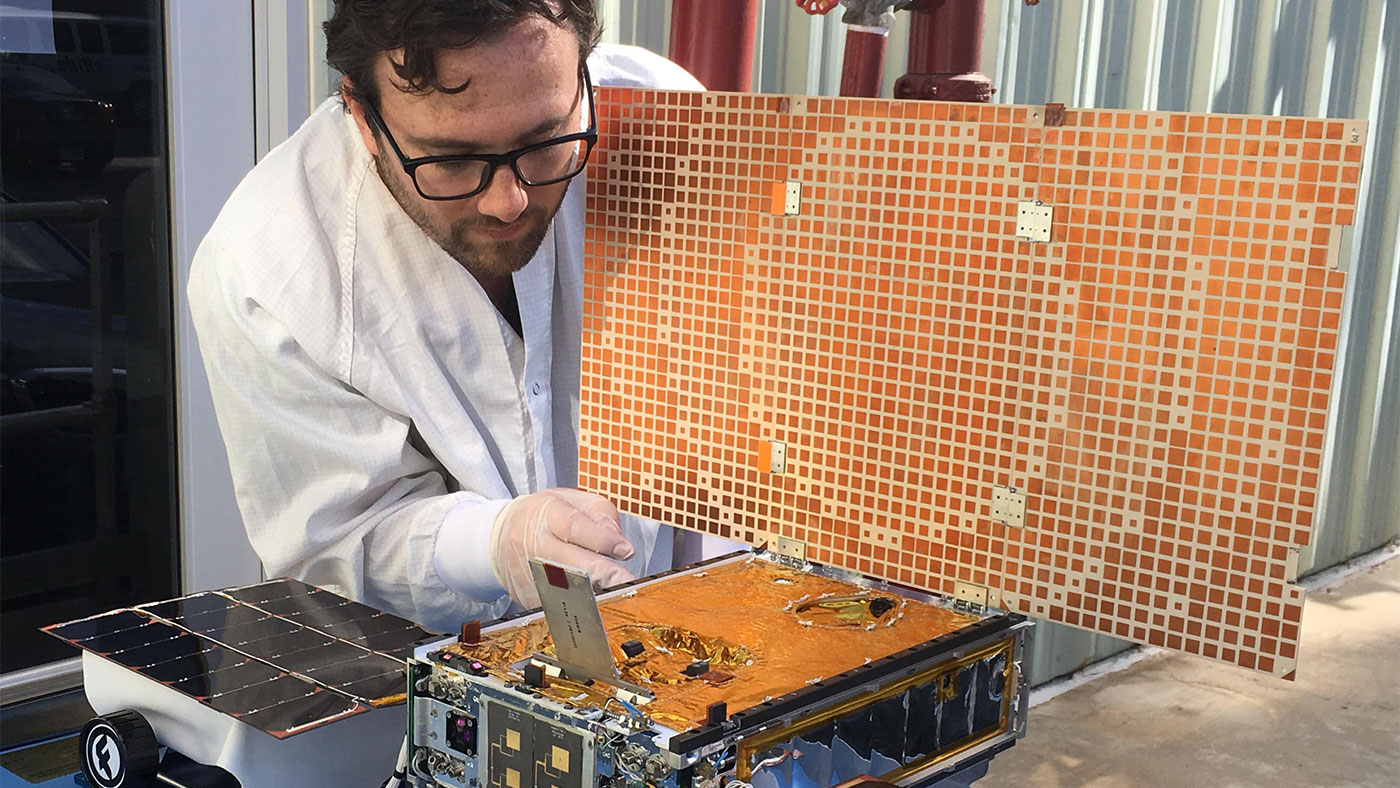
Unfolded microstrip reflectarray antenna on the Mars Cube One satellite

== Selected publications ==
Books

- Pozar, D. M. (1985). Antenna Design Using Personal Computers. Artech House. ISBN 9780890061756.
- Pozar, D. M.; Schaubert, D. H., eds. (1995). Microstrip Antennas: The Analysis and Design of Microstrip Antennas and Arrays. John Wiley & Sons. ISBN 9780780310780.
- Pozar, D. M. (2000). Microwave and RF Design of Wireless Systems. John Wiley & Sons. ISBN 9780471322825.
- Pozar, D. M. (2011). Microwave Engineering (4 ed.). John Wiley & Sons. ISBN 9780470631553.

Articles

- Croq, F.; Pozar, D.M. (December 1991). "Millimeter-wave design of wide-band aperture-coupled stacked microstrip antennas". IEEE Transactions on Antennas and Propagation. 39 (12): 1770–1776. Bibcode:1991ITAP...39.1770C. doi:10.1109/8.121599.
- Pozar, D.M. (January 1992). "Microstrip antennas". Proceedings of the IEEE. 80 (1): 79–91. doi:10.1109/5.119568.
- Targonski, S.D.; Pozar, D.M. (February 1993). "Design of wideband circularly polarized aperture-coupled microstrip antennas". IEEE Transactions on Antennas and Propagation. 41 (2): 214–220. Bibcode:1993ITAP...41..214T. doi:10.1109/8.214613.
- Pozar, D.M.; Metzler, T.A. (April 1993). "Analysis of a reflectarray antenna using microstrip patches of variable size". Electronics Letters. 29 (8): 657–658. Bibcode:1993ElL....29..657P. doi:10.1049/el:19930440.
- Pozar, D.M.; Targonski, S.D.; Syrigos, H.D. (February 1997). "Design of millimeter wave microstrip reflectarrays". IEEE Transactions on Antennas and Propagation. 45 (2): 287–296. Bibcode:1997ITAP...45..287P. doi:10.1109/8.560348.
- Targonski, S.D.; Waterhouse, R.B.; Pozar, D.M. (September 1998). "Design of wide-band aperture-stacked patch microstrip antennas". IEEE Transactions on Antennas and Propagation. 46 (9): 1245–1251. Bibcode:1998ITAP...46.1245T. doi:10.1109/8.719966.
- Kwon, Do-Hoon; Pozar, David M. (December 2009). "Optimal Characteristics of an Arbitrary Receive Antenna". IEEE Transactions on Antennas and Propagation. 57 (12): 3720–3727. Bibcode:2009ITAP...57.3720K. doi:10.1109/TAP.2009.2025975. S2CID 39725234.

== See also ==
- List of textbooks in electromagnetism
