= Berkeley Physics Course =

Series of textbooks intended for undergraduates

The Berkeley Physics Course is a series of college-level physics textbooks written mostly (but not exclusively) by UC Berkeley professors.

== Description ==
The series consists of the following five volumes, each of which was originally used in a one-semester course at Berkeley:

1. Mechanics, by Charles Kittel, Walter D. Knight, and Malvin Ruderman.
2. Electricity and Magnetism, by Edward M. Purcell
3. Waves, by Frank S. Crawford Jr.
4. Quantum Physics, by Eyvind H. Wichmann
5. Statistical Physics, by Frederick Reif

Volume 2, Electricity and Magnetism, by Purcell (Harvard), is particularly well known, and was influential for its use of relativity in the presentation of the subject at the introductory college level. Half a century later the book is still in print, in an updated version by authors Purcell and Morin. The third edition of the text, published by Cambridge University Press in 2013, was completely revised and updated to SI units.

== History ==
A Sputnik-era project funded by a National Science Foundation grant, the course arose from discussions between Philip Morrison (then at Cornell University) and Charles Kittel (Berkeley) in 1961, and was published by McGraw-Hill starting in 1965. The Berkeley course was contemporary with The Feynman Lectures on Physics (a college course at a similar mathematical level), and PSSC Physics (a high school introductory course). These physics courses were all developed in the atmosphere of urgency about science education created in the West by Sputnik.

Because of the government support received, the original editions contained notices on their copyright pages stating that the books were to be available royalty-free after five years. The authors got lump-sum payments but did not receive royalties. The legal status of the original editions has been befogged in the case of the renowned second volume by the fact that Cambridge University Press has made it effectively impossible to obtain the royalty-free license promised under the original government contract.

There was a parallel series of laboratory courses developed by Alan Portis. The Heathkit company marketed a line of its electronic instruments which had been adapted for use with Berkeley series of lab manuals.

The series was translated into a number of foreign languages. Although the course was influential in physics education worldwide, the book series sold better in foreign markets than in the US, possibly because students in other countries specialized earlier and were therefore better prepared mathematically than US students. It was felt to be too advanced for typical engineering students at Berkeley, but continued to be used there in honors courses for physics majors. Course adoption may have also been hindered by the initial choice of Gaussian units of measurement, and later editions of volumes 1 and 2 were eventually published with the Gaussian system replaced by SI units.

== See also ==
- The Feynman Lectures on Physics – another contemporaneously-developed and influential college-level physics series
- Course of Theoretical Physics – ten-volume series of books covering advanced theoretical physics, by Lev Landau and Evgeniy Lifshitz
- PSSC Physics – a contemporaneously-developed high-school-level physics textbook
- Harvard Project Physics – a contemporaneously-developed high-school-level physics textbook
