= Raphael Tsu =

American electrical engineer

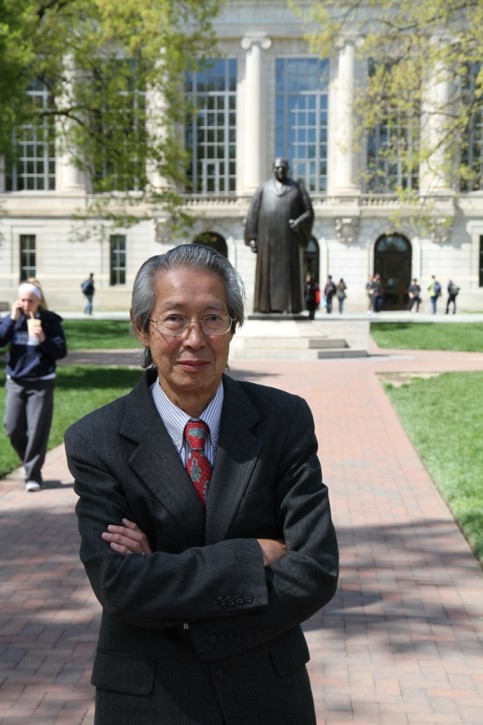
- Tsu in 2019
- Other name: Ray Tsu
- Education: University of Dayton: B.S., Electrical Engineering; Ohio State University: M.S., Electrical Engineering; Ph.D., Electrical Engineering
- Known for: Resonant tunneling diode
- Awards: International Prize for New Materials (1985)
- Scientific career
- Fields: Electrical engineering
- Workplaces: Bell Labs; Thomas J. Watson Research Center; National Renewable Energy Laboratory; University of North Carolina at Charlotte
- Thesis: The theory and application of the scattering matrix for electromagnetic waves (1960)
- Doctoral advisor: Robert Kouyoumjian

Raphael Tsu is an American electrical engineer who is Professor Emeritus of Electrical and Computer Engineering at the University of North Carolina at Charlotte. His research includes quantum devices, device materials, materials growth and characterization, and photovoltaics.

== Education ==
Tsu earned a Bachelor of Science in Electrical Engineering from the University of Dayton in 1956. He completed his graduate studies at Ohio State University, where he received a Master of Science in 1957 and a Doctor of Philosophy in 1960. His doctoral thesis was on the S-matrix theory and application for electromagnetic waves, supervised by Professor Robert Kouyoumjian of the Department of Electrical Engineering.

== Career ==
After several years working as a member of the technical staff at Bell Telephone Laboratories (BTL) at Murray Hill, NJ, developing an ultrasonic amplifier, a mechanism invented by D. L. White, Tsu moved to the IBM, T.J. Watson Research Center in Yorktown Heights, NY as an associate to Leo Esaki beginning a well-known collaboration that yielded a theory of man-made quantum materials, superlattices and quantum wells.

Tsu later joined the Amorphous Semiconductors Institute (ASI) and directed energy research at Energy Conversion Devices (ECD) near Detroit, MI, as invited by inventor Stan Ovshinsky. His contribution included the first experimental determination of the volume fraction of crystallinity for conductivity percolation in amorphous silicon and [germanium], and providing experimental proof of the existence of an intermediate order. He discovered experimentally that post annealing with H_{2} and O_{2} can drastically remove dangling bond defects in amorphous silicon.

From 1985 to 1987, Tsu served as the amorphous silicon program group leader at the National Renewable Energy Laboratory (then known as SERI, Solar Energy Research Institute) in Golden, CO. His theoretical derivation of the relationship between optical absorption and disorder in amorphous silicon and germanium in terms of fundamental constants shows that the slope of the Tauc plot is uniquely determined by the oscillator strength of the transition, the deformation potential, and the mean deviation of the atomic coordinates obtained from the radial distribution function (RDF).

In 1972, Tsu organized a group and was invited by the Chinese Science Academy that resulted in the first report on the technology in China published in Scientific American. This led to his involvement through establishing the first Chinese Scientific delegation visit to the US invited by the US-China Relations Committee of the US Academy of Science. During this visit, he worked with the US State Department for the program and logistics on the East Coast. This effort contributed to the opening of scientific exchange between the United States and China.

=== Invention of the superlattice ===
Of all his contributions, Tsu's most important impact has been in the invention of spatially modulated, or periodically layered, materials – the superlattice. The structure of a superlattice has remained a highly productive innovation in nanoelectronics well into the 21st century. Indeed, Tsu played a pivotal role in the creation, invention, and development of synthetic periodic superlattice materials and devices that functionally depend on these artificially fabricated two-dimensional multiple-quantum well structures while working in Leo Esaki's Exploratory Device Research Group in the IBM Watson Laboratories. Tsu introduced the idea of alternating layers of different material, A/B, with the correct band-edge offset. While at IBM, Tsu worked closely with L. L. Chang. Ray's theoretical analysis at IBM led to the important concept of modulation doping for carrier mobility enhancement independently of, and prior to, the work of Dingle, et al. at Bell Labs.

=== Contributions to other technologies ===
These pioneering contributions have led to many current technologies including terahertz oscillators, negative differential conductance (NDC) in the I–V characteristics of superlattice devices, resonant tunneling quantum well (double barrier) structures, of phonon band folding and the related Raman spectra, and the discovery of forbidden phonon modes. Raphael Tsu's other contributions have impacted a wide range of materials science.

A leitmotif in Tsu's career has been ubiquitous electron–lattice interactions in materials as well as quantum transport. One of his first publications from Bell Labs is concerned with radiation of phonons by non-accelerating charges. Another from IBM, is related to phonons and polaritons. He and Timir Datta have introduced the concept of wave impedance in quantum transport for dissipation-free quantum waves, where using the expressions for probability continuity and energy expectation an equation for quantum wave impedance of Schrödinger functions is obtained.

== Recognition ==
=== Memberships ===
Year	Organization	Type	Ref.
1980	American Physical Society	Fellow	

=== Awards ===
Year	Organization	Award	Co-recipients	Citation	Ref.
1985	American Physical Society	International Prize for New Materials	Leroy Chang and Leo Esaki	"For his conception of artificial semiconductor superlattices and his recognition that such structures have realizable and would have novel electronic properties. His sustained experimental and theoretical efforts have helped lead the way to versatile new materials and technologies."	

== Selected publications ==
- Tsu, Raphael (2010). Superlattice to Nanoelectronics. Elsevier. ISBN 9780080968131.
- Tsu, Raphael (2018). The World and I. LitFire Publishing. ISBN 9781641515887.
- Tsu, Raphael (2018). The World and I (Chinese ed.). Dixie W Publishing Corporation. ISBN 9781683721406.

== Notable papers ==
The following two papers were amongst the 50 most cited articles to appear in the first fifty years of the journal Applied Physics Letters published by the American Institute of Physics (AIP) and were featured as such in APL's 50th anniversary issue http://apl.aip.org/apl_50th_anniversary .

- R. Tsu & L. Esaki (1973). "Tunneling in a finite superlattice". Applied Physics Letters. 22 (11): 562. Bibcode:1973ApPhL..22..562T. doi:10.1063/1.1654509.
- L. L. Chang; L. Esaki & R. Tsu (1974). "Resonant tunneling in semiconductor double barriers". Applied Physics Letters. 24 (12): 593. Bibcode:1974ApPhL..24..593C. doi:10.1063/1.1655067.
