= William Smythe (physicist) =

American physicist (1893–1988)

William Ralph Smythe (July 5, 1893 – July 6, 1988) was a physicist at California Institute of Technology.

== Early life ==
A native of Canon City, Colorado, he graduated from Colorado College and spent some time in Dartmouth College before his studies were interrupted by World War I. He eventually completed his Ph.D. at the University of Chicago in 1921 under Nobel laureate Albert Michelson and Henry Gale.

== Career ==
After teaching in the University of the Philippines, he became a professor at Caltech in 1923, remaining there until he retired in 1964 as professor emeritus.

His research focused on "electromagnetic studies, the separation of isotopes, isolation of radioactive potassium and other elements, and the isotope ratio of oxygen." In 1926, Smythe was the first to propose ion-velocity spectrometers, which he eventually built with Josef Mattauch.

Smythe taught at least six Nobel Prize laureates: Charles Townes, Donald Glaser, William Shockley, Carl Anderson, James Rainwater, and Edwin McMillan, who won the Chemistry prize. In 1939 he authored a textbook on applied electromagnetism titled Static and Dynamic Electricity, which was a widely used reference specially by electrical engineers in the field during the 20th century. His electromagnetism course was modeled after the Cambridge Mathematical Tripos examinations and designed to "weed out weaklings." Smythe's course was so infamous that future Nobel Prize in Economics laureate Vernon Smith switched to electrical engineering from physics to avoid it.

== Personal life ==
Smythe's son, William Rodman Smythe, became a professor of physics at the University of Colorado, Boulder. Smythe died in Boulder, Colorado, on July 6, 1988.

== See also ==
- List of textbooks in electromagnetism
