= Leroy Chang =

Taiwanese–American electrical engineer (1936–2008)

- 張立綱
- Born: Leroy Li-Gong Chang; January 20, 1936; Kaifeng, China
- Died: August 10, 2008 (aged 72)
- Education: National Taiwan University: B.S., Electrical Engineering; Stanford University: Ph.D., Electrical Engineering
- Known for: Superlattices; Quantum wells
- Spouse: Helen Hsiang-Yung (m. 1962)
- Children: 2, including Leslie
- Mother: Li Xiangheng
- Relatives: Peter Hessler (son-in-law)
- Awards: International Prize for New Materials (1985); IEEE David Sarnoff Award (1990); Stuart Ballantine Medal (1993)
- Scientific career
- Fields: Electrical engineering
- Workplaces: Thomas J. Watson Research Center; Hong Kong University of Science and Technology
- Thesis: Diffusion, solubility, and distribution coefficient of zinc in gallium arsenide and galium phosphide (1963)
- Doctoral advisor: Gerald Pearson

Leroy Chang
- Traditional Chinese: 張立綱
- Simplified Chinese: 张立纲
Transcriptions
Standard Mandarin
- Hanyu Pinyin: Zhāng Lìgāng

Leroy Li-Gong Chang (Chinese: 張立綱; pinyin: Zhāng Lìgāng; January 20, 1936 – August 10, 2008) was a Taiwanese–American electrical engineer. Born in China, he studied in Taiwan and then the United States, obtaining his doctorate from Stanford University in 1963. As a research physicist, he studied semiconductors for nearly 30 years at the Thomas J. Watson Research Center in New York. This period included pioneering work on superlattice heterostructures with Nobel Prize-winning physicist Leo Esaki.

In 1993, Chang moved from New York to Hong Kong, switching from industrial research into academia in anticipation of the 1997 transfer of the British colony to China. He was among the first wave of recruits to the Hong Kong University of Science and Technology. Over the following 14 years, he helped build the university's reputation in his roles as Dean of Science, Professor of Physics, Vice President of Academic Affairs, and professor emeritus.

Honors bestowed on Chang included memberships of the National Academy of Sciences, the Chinese Academy of Sciences, and Academia Sinica (the national academy of Taiwan). Awards received included the International Prize for New Materials (1985), the David Sarnoff Award (1990), and the Stuart Ballantine Medal (1993). Chang's death in 2008 was marked with memorial services, and a symposium in his memory was held the following year.

== Early life and education ==
Leroy Li-Gong Chang's family was from Jiutai County, Jilin, in Manchuria, China. After the Japanese invasion of Manchuria in 1931, his family escaped to inland China, and Chang was born on January 20, 1936, in Kaifeng, Henan. His father, Zhang Shenfu, was a well-known geologist and government official who was assassinated by the Communists in 1946, which prompted the family to move to Taiwan. His mother, Li Xiangheng, was one of the first group of women elected to the Legislative Yuan in 1948.

In 1957, Chang graduated with a bachelor's degree from the Department of Electrical Engineering at National Taiwan University. After serving in the Taiwanese Armed Forces, he immigrated to the United States in 1961 to continue his studies, receiving a Doctor of Philosophy in Electrical Engineering from Stanford University in 1963.

== Career and research ==
=== IBM ===
Between 1963 and 1992, Chang worked at IBM's Thomas J. Watson Research Center in New York. He held the position of researcher for some twelve years (1963–1968; 1969–1975), with a sabbatical year as Associate Professor in the Department of Electrical Engineering at the Massachusetts Institute of Technology (1968–1969). On his return to IBM research, he spent nine years as manager of its Molecular Beam Epitaxy section (1975–1984). This was followed by seven years as manager of the Quantum Structure section (1985–1992). His research included semiconductor physics, low-dimensional electron systems, and nanostructures. In the 1970s, he pioneered development of quantum well and superlattice structure (SLS) techniques.

One of the key results from Chang's work in this period was using molecular beam epitaxy to grow superlattice structures in semiconductors. This research was described in a 1973 paper in the Journal of Vacuum Science and Technology that was cited multiple times over the following years. Eleven years later, in 1984, this pioneering research paper was featured as a Citation Classic by the ISI, an organization that tracks and measures impact factor and citation frequency and volume for journals and individual research papers. Commentary for this retrospective article was provided by Chang. The impact of the research carried out in the 1970s by Chang and his colleagues, including Nobel Prize-winning Leo Esaki and Raphael Tsu, was highlighted by IBM researchers Theis and Coufal in 2004:

Leo Esaki, Ray Tsu, and Leroy Chang began to envision and investigate designed quantum structures — which are based on interfaces between lattice-matched compound semiconductors — early in the 1970s. Ever since, the study of electronic systems of minute dimensions has ranked among the most exciting areas of condensed-matter physics.

=== HKUST ===
After 29 years at IBM, Chang moved from industrial research into academia, being appointed the first Dean of Science at the Hong Kong University of Science and Technology (HKUST) in 1993. This was a new university, having been established in 1991. Chang's arrival was described in a 2011 account of the rise of this university: "Other recruits during the first decade included Leroy Chang, a world-renowned experimental physicist from International Business Machines (IBM)." He held the position of Dean of Science until 1998, when he became Vice President of Academic Affairs—stepping down from this role in 2000. From 1997 until his retirement in 2007, he was also University Professor of Physics.

Chang's departure from New York and arrival in Hong Kong in 1993 was part of a wider influx that saw many leading scientists and researchers taking up positions at universities and institutions in the British colony to be able to take advantage of the opportunities presented by the handover of Hong Kong in 1997. Quoted in an article in 1996, Chang stated:

I would never have come to Hong Kong if it was going to remain just a British colony. We came because of 1997.

In addition to his work at HKUST, Chang also supported other science and technology institutions in Hong Kong and the wider region. From 1996 to 1998, he was President of the Hong Kong Institute of Science. In 1998, Chang played a key role in the founding and establishment of the Research Center for Applied Sciences (RCAS) of Academia Sinica in Taiwan, serving on its advisory committee.

== Family ==
In 1961, during his trip to the United States, Chang met Helen Hsiang-Yung, whom he married the following year. They had two children, Justin and Leslie. Leslie is an author and journalist who is married to Peter Hessler, author of several books about China.

== Death and tributes ==
Chang died on August 10, 2008, at the age of 72. Memorial services were held on August 17 in El Camino Memorial Park in San Diego, California, and at the Hong Kong University of Science and Technology. A memorial symposium in his honor, 'Recent Advances in Applied Sciences', was held in 2009 at the Academia Sinica. The symposium program included "A Tribute to Academician Leroy Chang" and "Remembering Leroy: from SL/QW to RCAS". At the time of his death, tributes were paid to Chang by his HKUST colleagues, including the university's founding president Chia-Wei Woo:

Leroy was always exuberant and high-spirited, logical and sensible, forceful and clear, efficient and effective – and always full of wit and humor. As Dean of Science and Vice-President for Academic Affairs, he gave up his beloved and world-renowned scientific career to work totally selflessly towards providing a sound academic environment for his colleagues. HKUST's founding members could not have had a stronger comrade-in-arms in building this new university. I so very deeply mourn his passing.

== Recognition ==
=== Memberships ===
Year	Organization	Type	Ref.
1982	American Physical Society	Fellow	
1988	National Academy of Engineering	Member	
1990	Institute of Electrical and Electronics Engineers	Fellow	
1994	National Academy of Sciences	Member	
1994	Academia Sinica	Academician	
1994	Chinese Academy of Sciences	Foreign Member	

=== Awards ===
Year	Organization	Award	Co-recipients	Citation	Ref.
1985	American Physical Society	International Prize for New Materials	Leo Esaki and Raphael Tsu	"For his conception of artificial semiconductor superlattices and his recognition that such structures have realizable and would have novel electronic properties. His sustained experimental and theoretical efforts have helped lead the way to versatile new materials and technologies."	
1990	Institute of Electrical and Electronics Engineers	IEEE David Sarnoff Award	—	"For pioneering contributions to the realization and development of quantum wells and superlattices."	
1993	Franklin Institute	Stuart Ballantine Medal	—	"For applications of semiconductor P."	

=== Honorary degrees ===
Year	University	Degree	Ref.
1995	Hong Kong University of Science and Technology	Doctor of Science	
