= Constantine A. Balanis =

American electrical engineer and academic

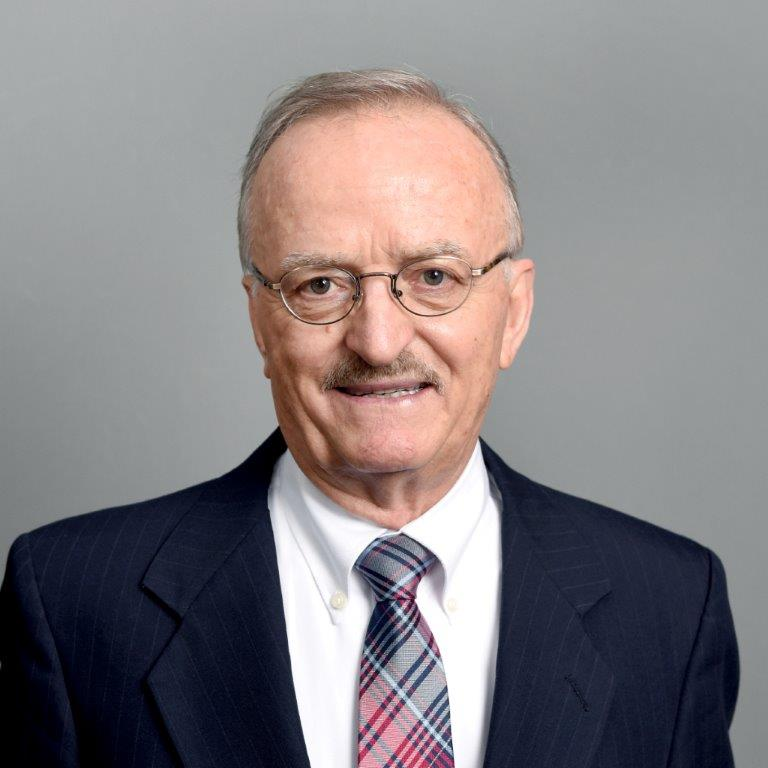
- Balanis in 2018
- Born: October 29, 1938 (age 87); Trikala, Greece
- Education: Virginia Tech; University of Virginia; Ohio State University
- Awards: IEEE Electromagnetics Award (2021)
- Scientific career
- Fields: Electromagnetics, antenna theory
- Workplaces: Arizona State University; West Virginia University; NASA Langley Research Center

Constantine A. Balanis is a Greek-born American scientist, educator, author, and Regents Professor at Arizona State University. Born in Trikala, Greece on October 29, 1938. He is best known for his books in the fields of engineering electromagnetics and antenna theory. He emigrated to the United States in 1955, where he studied electrical engineering. He received United States citizenship in 1960.

== Biography ==
Balanis received the Bachelor of Science degree from Virginia Tech (Virginia Polytechnic Institute and State University), in 1964, the Master of Science degree from the University of Virginia, in 1966, and the Doctor of Philosophy degree in electrical engineering from Ohio State University, in 1969, and an honorary doctorate from the Aristotle University of Thessaloniki in 2004.

From 1964 to 1970 he was with the National Aeronautics and Space Administration (NASA) Langley Research Center in Hampton, Virginia and from 1970 to 1983 he was with the Department of Electrical Engineering, West Virginia University, Morgantown, WV. Since 1983 he has been with the Department of Electrical Engineering, Arizona State University, where in 1991 he was named Regents' Professor of Electrical Engineering. His research interests are in computational electromagnetics, electromagnetic metasurfaces for RCS reduction, antenna beamforming, and low-profile antennas. He received the IEEE AP Society 2005 Chen-To Tai Distinguished Educator Award, the 2000 IEEE Third Millennium Medal, the 1997 Outstanding Graduate Mentor Award of Arizona State University, the 1992 Special Professionalism Award from the IEEE Phoenix Section, the 1989 IEEE Region 6 Individual Achievement Award, and the 1987–1988 Graduate Teaching Excellence Award, School of Engineering, Arizona State University. Professor Balanis is the "architect" of the Arizona State University ElectroMagnetic Anechoic Chamber (EMAC).

Balanis is a Life Fellow of the IEEE, and a member of Sigma Xi, Electromagnetics Academy, Tau Beta Pi, Eta Kappa Nu, and Phi Kappa Phi. He has served as associate editor of the IEEE Transactions on Antennas and Propagation (1974–1977) and the IEEE Transactions on Geoscience and Remote Sensing (1981–1984), as editor of the Newsletter for the IEEE Geoscience and Remote Sensing Society (1982–1983), as Second Vice-president (1984) and member of the Administrative Committee (1984–85) of the IEEE Geoscience and Remote Sensing Society, and as Chairman of the Distinguished Lecturer Program of the IEEE Antennas and Propagation Society (1988–1991), Distinguished Lecturer of IEEE Antennas and Propagation Society (2003–2005), and member of the AdCom (1992–95, 1996–1999) of the IEEE Antennas and Propagation Society. He is the author of Antenna Theory: Analysis and Design (Wiley; 1982, 1997, 2005) and Advanced Engineering Electromagnetics (Wiley, 1989).

His research concentrates on electromagnetics, antennas and microwaves. His current focus of research is on computational electromagnetics, electromagnetic metasurfaces for RCS reduction, antenna beamforming and low-profile antennas. He has written numerous books, journals and conference papers. Balanis is married with two children and two grandchildren.

== Books ==
- Balanis CA, Advanced Engineering Electromagnetics, 3rd ed, Wiley, 2024.
- Balanis CA, Antenna Theory: Analysis and Design, 4th ed, Wiley, 2016.
- Balanis CA, (Ed), Modern Antenna Handbook, Wiley, 2008.
- Balanis CA, Birtcher CR, Georgakopoulos SV, Panaretos AH, Penetration of High Intensity Radiated Fields (HIRF) Into General Aviation Aircraft, NASA, 2004.
- Balanis CA, Ioannides PI, Introduction to Smart Antennas, Springer, 2022.

== Awards ==
- Outstanding Researcher, College of Engineering, West Virginia University (1981, 1982, 1983).
- Halliburton Best Researcher Award, College of Engineering, West Virginia University (1983).
- Fellow of the Institute of Electrical and Electronics Engineers (IEEE) (1986).
- Graduate Teaching Excellence Award, School of Engineering, Arizona State University (1987).
- IEEE Region 6 Individual Achievement Award "In recognition for continued outstanding leadership to IEEE and dedicated service to his profession as an author and practicing engineer." (1989).
- Regents' Professor of Electrical Engineering, Arizona State University (1991).
- Special Professionalism Award, IEEE Phoenix Section "For the establishment and promotion of the highest standards for Electrical Engineering Education through creative and original research, professional service, faculty development, curriculum, teaching and accreditation." (1992).
- Outstanding Graduate Mentor Award, Arizona State University (1996).
- The IEEE Third Millennium Medal (2000).
- Honorary Doctorate, Aristotle University of Thessaloniki, Thessaloniki, Greece (2004).
- Life Fellow of the Institute of Electrical and Electronics Engineers (IEEE) (2004).
- IEEE AP Society Chen-To Distinguished Educator Award (2005).
- Distinguished Achievement Award, IEEE AP Society (2012).
- Distinguished Achievement Alumnus Award, College of Engineering, The Ohio State University (2012).
- LAPC James R. James Lifetime Achievement Award, UK (2014).
- IEEE MTT-S Rudolph E. Henning Distinguished Mentoring Award (2017).
- IEEE Electromagnetics Award from the Institute of Electrical and Electronics Engineers (2021).

== See also ==
- List of textbooks in electromagnetism
