= The Flying Circus of Physics =

Book by Jearl Walker

- First edition
- Author: Jearl Walker
- Illustrator: Anna Melhorn
- Cover artist: Norm Christiansen
- Language: English
- Subject: The physics of real-world phenomena
- Publisher: John Wiley and Sons
- Publication date: 1975 (1st ed.); 1977 (1st ed. with answers); 2007 (2nd ed.)
- Publication place: United States
- Pages: 331
- ISBN: 978-0-471-76273-7
- OCLC: 64595915
- Text: The Flying Circus of Physics at Internet Archive

The Flying Circus of Physics by Jearl Walker (1975, published by John Wiley and Sons; "with Answers" in 1977; 2nd edition in 2007), is a book that poses and answers 740 questions that are concerned with everyday physics. There is a strong emphasis upon phenomena that might be encountered in one's daily life. The questions are interspersed with 38 "short stories" about related material.

The book covers topics relating to motion, fluids, sound, thermal processes, electricity, magnetism, optics, and vision.

There is a website for the book which stores over 11,000 references, 2,000 links, new material, a detailed index, and other supplementary material. There is also a collection of YouTube videos by the author on the material. See External links at the bottom of this page.

Jearl Walker is a professor of physics at Cleveland State University. He is also known for his work on the highly popular textbook of introductory physics, Fundamentals of Physics, which is currently in its 12th edition. From 1978 until 1990, Walker wrote The Amateur Scientist column in Scientific American magazine.

== Examples ==
Typically, the questions posed by the book are about everyday phenomena that most people do not think about. For example, here is question 4.78, "A Candle Flame":

How does a candle burn; that is, how does it consume its fuel? Why is the light from a candle flame largely yellow, and why do blue regions usually form along the side of the flame? (Fig. 4-12) Why is there a dark cone between the wick and the yellow part of the flame? Why do some candles smoke; why do some flicker? Why is soot from a flame black, and yet white vapor is emitted from a candle that has just been extinguished?

Note that this question is actually a series of closely related sub-questions. This is often the case. Here is another example; this one is an excerpt from question 5.2, "Lightning: People, cows, and sheep":

... If a person is caught outdoors during a lightning storm, what can the person do to reduce the danger? For example, should the person hide beneath a tree or stand in an open field? Should the person stand still, crouch, or run? Why can a person's hair stand up, and is that a sign of danger? ...

Here is a third example; this one is an excerpt from question 6.1, "Rainbows":

... Normally, you see only one rainbow, but sometimes you might find two, each a partial circle around a common point. What is that point? Why is the color sequence of the two rainbows reversed? Why is the region between the rainbows relatively dark? Why is the upper rainbow broader and dimmer than the lower one? ...

Many of the short stories are descriptions of particular events. For example, item 1.54 is the short story "Bomber crashes into Empire State Building." The story describes how this actually occurred in 1945 and what happened to the bomber, the building, and one of the elevators.

== History ==
As is discussed in the preface of the book, the idea for the collection of real-world physics phenomena started when Jearl was a graduate student teaching assistant, and was asked by a student to give an example of how physics had anything to do with his life. The collection grew steadily over time, and he gave it a name that he thought would attract attention. Eventually it became large enough and popular enough to justify publication. The original 1975 edition provided no answers to the questions, but did provide references to use as a starting point. This was followed in 1977 by a modified 1st edition that included a section at the back with answers or partial answers to the questions. The author continued to work on the project and 31 years later, in 2006, the 2nd edition was released. It is a major expansion of the material and the answers now immediately follow the questions. The references for the 2nd edition are kept in an online website (see External links below) along with other useful material. The book has been translated and published in 11 different languages, the colorful covers of which can be seen here.

== Reception ==
The various editions of the book all received highly favorable reviews.

The reviews make it clear that the book poses questions about the real world that most readers will find interesting and which present challenges at all levels of expertise from high school science student to professional physicist.

Edward Adelson, physicist at Ohio State University writes of the 2nd edition: "Jearl Walker, known for writing of exceptional clarity in his editions of Fundamentals of Physics by Halliday, Resnick, and Walker, has offered us a new, expanded version of The Flying Circus of Physics, his collection of natural phenomena and physics oddities. ... This book, full of examples you will want to think through or discuss with friends, also includes phenomena that have not yet been fully tested or explained. It is easy for a physicist to become immersed in this book and ignore colleagues, spouse, children, and earthquakes."

A staff writer for Goodreads said in a review of the 2nd edition: "Wiley published the first edition of Jearl Walker’s The Flying Circus of Physics, which has sold over 100,000 copies and become a cult classic in the physics community. The Flying Circus is a compendium of interesting real world phenomena that can be explained using basic laws of physics. This new edition represents a thorough updating and modernization of the book. The new edition gives us the opportunity to highlight Jearl’s creativity, his communication skills, and his ability to make physics interesting."

Thomas E Taylor, at the University of Arizona, says in a review of the 1st edition (with answers), "Jearl Walker's 'Flying Circus of Physics' is so fascinating that it is difficult to review. In 174 pages, no less than 618 "just-for-fun" problems are posed regarding things that we see in everyday life. ... While this little book comes with 'physics' in the title, it obviously transcends that single science (if indeed it can be isolated). My students not only read it with enthusiasm, they also try out the things that are listed. And, with time, they resist looking at the answers until they have thoroughly experimented with each phenomenon."

Brian E Woolnough of University of Oxford says of the 1st edition (with answers) "Now and again there is published a book which comes like a breath of fresh air through the existing tomes in that field; such a book is The Flying Circus of Physics by Professor Jearl Walker - It is a delight to peruse. ... Having met Jearl Walker I know that he would hope that his book would make people realize that physics is not an irrelevant, esoteric art which is the sole preserve of those who communicate with advanced mathematics. On the contrary, there is physics all around us, and an appreciation of this can make the whole of our life more enjoyable and more fun."

Douglas D. Smith, a high school teacher, in a review of the 1st edition (without answers), says "The book is especially valuable to a general science teacher but has many items that relate to high school chemistry. One successful use of the book was to give students the opportunity to choose one of the phenomena and find answers to the related questions by checking into the references."

In a review of the 1st edition (without answers), Robert H. Romer, a physics professor at Amherst College, says "I recommend this book without reservation to everyone who enjoys physics, who knows the subject and who wants to learn more about its application to real phenomena. My major worry about the book is my fear that it might be mistaken for an 'elementary' book. It is true that no quantum mechanics is needed, for instance, to grapple with these questions, but at least with many of these questions, you will not get far without a sound knowledge of classical physics."
