= Raymond Luebbers =

American scientist

Dr. Raymond J. Luebbers (born 2 September 1946) was Professor of Electrical Engineering at The Pennsylvania State University and Ohio University, a Research Scientist at the Lockheed Martin Research Laboratory in Palo Alto, CA and founder of Remcom, Inc.

== Education and academic career ==
Luebbers received the B.S.E.E. from the University of Cincinnati with High Honors, and M.S.E.E. and Ph.D. in Electrical Engineering from Ohio State University, 1975. In 1984, he joined the Electrical Engineering Department of The Pennsylvania State University. During the 1991-1992 academic year he was a National Science Foundation Visiting Professor in the Faculty of Engineering, Tohoku University, Sendai, Japan.

== Remcom ==
While a professor at Penn State he founded Remcom, Inc, a company which develops of commercial electromagnetic analysis software. In December 2001 he resigned from Penn State, retaining the title of Adjunct Professor.

Remcom also performs research and development under contract to government and industry.

It has won awards for innovation. Remcom was one of only five companies to receive a 2001 US Army Small Business Innovative Research Quality Award.

Luebbers retired from Remcom, Inc. in July 2008 but still consults with the company regularly.

== Research and writing ==
Luebbers has published in the areas of analysis of frequency selective surfaces, applications of the Geometrical Theory of Diffraction, and applications and extensions of the Finite-difference time-domain method. He is co-author of a book called The Finite Difference Time Domain Method for Electromagnetics. He has made invited presentations and presented short courses at several international meetings. The paper "FDTD Calculation of Scattering from Frequency-Dependent Materials," by R. Luebbers, D. Steich, and K. Kunz, received the 1993 Schelkunoff Best Paper Award of the IEEE Antennas and Propagation Society.

He has served on the Board of Directors and as Vice-President of the Applied Computational Electromagnetics Society (ACES). He is a Member of International Union of Radio Science (URSI) Commission B, and is a member of IEEE Standards Coordinating Committee 34 on Electromagnetic Energy Product Performance Safety.

== Awards ==
- Elected Fellow of the Institute of Electrical and Electronics Engineers
- The paper "FDTD Calculation of Scattering from Frequency-Dependent Materials," by R. Luebbers, D. Steich, and K. Kunz (September 1993 issue of AP-S Transactions) received the Schelkunoff Best Paper Award of the IEEE Antennas and Propagation Society.

== Select publications ==
- R. Luebbers, A. Smith, S.A. Fast, J.W. Schuster, “A Demonstration of Utilizing High Fidelity Propagation Models for Emitter Localization in Urban Environments,” International Union of Radio Science (URSI), Boulder, CO, January 5–8, 2004.
- R. Luebbers, “Using FDTD To Illustrate the Behavior of Double Negative Materials,” 2003 IEEE International Antennas and Propagation Symposium and USNC/CNC/URS North American Radio Science Meeting, pp. 30, June 2003.
- C. Penney, R. Luebbers, and J. Schuster. "Scattering from Coated Targets Using a Frequency-Dependent, Surface Impedance Boundary Condition," IEEE Transactions on Antennas and Propagation, vol 44, no 4, pp 434–443, April 1996
- R. Luebbers, "Comparison of Lossy Wedge Diffraction Coefficients with Application to Mixed Path Propagation Loss Prediction", IEEE Transactions on Antennas and Propagation, vol 36, no 7, pp 1031–1034, July 1988.
- R. Luebbers, "Propagation Prediction for Hilly Terrain Using GTD Wedge Diffraction", IEEE Transactions on Antennas and Propagation, vol 32, no 9, pp. 951–955, September 1984.
- R. Luebbers, "Finite Conductivity Uniform GTD Versus Knife Edge Diffraction in Prediction of Propagation Path Loss", IEEE Transactions on Antennas and Propagation, vol 32, no 1, pp. 70–76, January 1984.

=== University level textbook ===
- Karl S. Kunz and Raymond J. Luebbers (1993). The Finite Difference Time Domain Method for Electromagnetics. CRC Press. ISBN 978-0-8493-8657-2. Archived from the original on 2007-12-10.

== See also ==
- List of textbooks in electromagnetism
