= Ben Munk =

Professor of electrical engineering

Benedikt Aage Munk (December 3, 1929 – March 13, 2009) was professor of electrical engineering at the ElectroScience Laboratory (ESL) at Ohio State University (OSU), Columbus, Ohio, US.

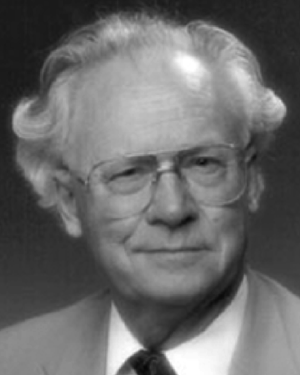

Munk is best known for his contributions to the field of applied electromagnetic, especially periodic surfaces (also known as metasurfaces) and antenna arrays. He is the author of many papers on periodic surfaces and antennas, as well as two key books. The most significant work are the "Finite Antenna Arrays and FSS" in which he discusses the design of the ultra wide band tightly coupled dipole antenna array and "Frequency Selective Surfaces: Theory and Design". Unlike other antenna books that heavily emphasize theory and mathematics, Munk's approach is based on intuitive understanding and engineering aspects of the subjects. He had contributed two chapters to the third edition of John Kraus' classic book, "Antennas for All Applications", published in 2002. His last book publication is named "Metamaterials: Critique and Alternatives" which was published in 2009 by Wiley. In this books he argues against negative permittivity/permeability meta-materials and cloaking.

According to his own words and Vita published alongside his dissertation, Munk graduated from a high school in Denmark in 1948. Afterwards he studied Electrical Engineering at the Technical University of Denmark also known as The Polytechnic Institute of Denmark and obtained master's degree in 1954. From 1954 to 1957 he served in the Royal Danish Navy as a Lieutenant and antenna/radar engineer. He was an assistant group leader at Rohde and Schwarz in Munich, Germany developing antennas (1957–59). Munk was a chief designer for A/S Nordisk Antenne Fabrik, Denmark and worked with antennas, centralized antenna systems, and filters from 1959-60. From 1960 to 1963, he was a research and development engineer with the Andrew Corporation, Chicago, Illinois, working with antennas. Later on, from 1963–64, he was an antenna researcher with Rockwell International in Columbus, Ohio working on antenna feeds, circular apertures, and anomalies. He was a PhD student in electrical engineering at the Ohio State University (OSU) from 1964-1968. His Ph.D. advisor was Prof. Robert G. Kouyoumjian who was a pioneer in the area of Uniform Theory of Diffraction (UTD). His project supervisor was Prof. Leon Peters Jr. Munk's Ph.D. dissertation is titled "Scattering by Periodic Arrays of Loaded Elements". After receiving his Ph.D., he joined the faculty at the Ohio State University and ElectroScience Laboratory, where he was a professor and later, professor emeritus, until he died. Prof. Munk was became an IEEE Fellow in 1989. Munk served as National Distinguished Lecturer for Antennas and Propgation Society (APS) from 1982 to 1985.

Munk died on Friday, March 13, 2009, at Arlington Court Nursing Home, Columbus, Ohio. He was 79.
