= Leslie T. Chang =

Chinese-American journalist and author

- 張彤禾
- Born: New York, United States
- Education: Harvard University
- Occupation: Journalist
- Spouse: Peter Hessler
- Parent(s): Leroy Chang, Helen Chang

Leslie T. Chang (Chinese: 張彤禾; pinyin: Zhāng Tónghé) is a Chinese-American journalist and the author of Factory Girls: From Village to City in a Changing China (2008). A former China correspondent for The Wall Street Journal, she has been described as "an insightful interpreter of a society in flux."

== Early life ==
Chang was born in New York, United States. Chang's father was Leroy L. Chang, a physicist, researcher, professor, and Dean of Science at Hong Kong University of Science and Technology. Chang was raised outside of New York City, New York.

Her grandfather, Zhang Shenfu, a mining engineer who had studied in the U.S. and then worked for the Kuomintang government, was bayoneted to death in 1946 by Communist soldiers.

== Education ==
In 1991, Chang earned a degree in American history and literature from Harvard University.

== Published books ==
In 2004 as a reporter for The Wall Street Journal, Chang visited Dongguan, Guangdong province, China.

=== Factory Girls ===
In response to the negative press surrounding occupational safety and health in Chinese factories. Chang decided to explore the subject from the perspective of the workers. In 2004 she traveled to the South Central China factory city of Dongguan to document the lives of Wu Chunming and Lu Qingmin, two migrant workers who were born to poor farming families. The book follows their lives over three years and also includes the author's own family history of migration within China and to the West.

Factory Girls was named by The New York Times as one of 100 Notable Books in 2008 and also received the 2009 PEN USA Literary Award for Research Nonfiction and the Asian American Literary Award for nonfiction.

=== Factory Girls Updated Post Financial Crisis ===
In 2010, Chang published Factory Girls Updated Post Financial Crisis. The author observed that the 2008 financial crisis has led to a business slowdown in Dongguan and that the home villages of workers have provided a safety valve with some workers even taking up a job outside Dongguan.

=== Egyptian Made: Women, Work and the Promise of Liberation ===
In 2024 Chang released Egyptian Made: Women, Work and the Promise of Liberation. Chang explores the lives of three women living and working in the textile industry in Egypt, and documents the challenges of traditional culture with the demands of globalization.

== Personal life ==
Chang's husband is Peter Hessler, an author.

== Awards and honors ==
- 2009 PEN USA Literary Award for Research Nonfiction (Factory Girls)
- 2008 New York Times Notable Book (Factory Girls)

== See also ==
- List of Harvard University people § Journalism
