= Victor H. Rumsey =

English Electrical Engineer

Victor Henry Rumsey (November 22, 1919 – March 11, 2015) was an electrical engineer, best known for his studies of frequency-independent antennas.

Rumsey was born in Devizes, Wiltshire, England, on Saint Cecilia's day, and received his BA in mathematics (1941) and Sc.D. in physics from Cambridge University. From 1941–1945 he performed radar research at the Telecommunications Research Establishment in England and the Naval Research Laboratory, Washington, D.C. After three years at the Canadian Atomic Research Laboratory he became director of the Antenna Laboratory at Ohio State University. In 1954 he moved to the University of Illinois, in 1957 to the University of California, Berkeley, and in 1966 to the University of California, San Diego where he was a professor and, later, professor emeritus.

Starting in the 1950s, Rumsey suggested the basic principles for frequency-independent antennas which culminated in the writing of a book on the topic (see selected works below).

Rumsey is a member of the National Academy of Engineering, and has received an honorary Doctor of Engineering degree from Tohoku University, Japan, the 1962 IEEE Morris N. Liebmann Memorial Award, and the 2004 John Kraus Antenna Award.

== Selected works ==
- "Frequency-Independent Antennas", IRE National Convention Record, vol. 5, part 1, 1957, pages 114-118.
- Frequency Independent Antennas, New York: Academic Press, Inc., 1966.
