= Ferran Martin =

Spanish engineer inventor and industrial designer

Ferran Martin from the Autonomous University of Barcelona (UAB), Bellaterra, Barcelona was named Fellow of the Institute of Electrical and Electronics Engineers (IEEE) in 2012 for contributions to metamaterial-based transmission lines for microwave applications.
