= Robert Resnick =

American physicist (1923–2014)

- Born: January 11, 1923; Baltimore, Maryland, United States
- Died: January 29, 2014 (aged 91); Pittsburgh, Pennsylvania
- Education: Johns Hopkins University
- Awards: Oersted Medal (1975)
- Scientific career
- Fields: Physics
- Workplaces: University of Pittsburgh; Rensselaer Polytechnic Institute

Robert Resnick (January 11, 1923 – January 29, 2014) was a physics educator and author of physics textbooks.

He was born in Baltimore, Maryland, on January 11, 1923 and graduated from the Baltimore City College high school in 1939. He received his B.A. in 1943 and his Ph.D. in 1949, both in physics from Johns Hopkins University. From 1949 to 1956, he was a member of the faculty at the University of Pittsburgh, where he first met David Halliday, with whom he wrote his most widely read textbook. He later became a professor at Rensselaer Polytechnic Institute (RPI) and was head of the interdisciplinary science curriculum for fifteen years. During his years at RPI, he authored or co-authored seven textbooks on relativity, quantum physics, and general physics, which have been translated into more than 47 languages. It is estimated that over 10 million students have studied from his books. In 1960, Physics, the first-year textbook he wrote with Prof. Halliday, was published. The book has been used widely and is considered to have revolutionized physics education. Now in its tenth edition in a five-volume set revised by Jearl Walker, and under the title Fundamentals of Physics, it is still highly regarded. It is noted for its clear standardized diagrams, very thorough but highly readable pedagogy, outlook into modern physics, and challenging, thought-provoking problems. In 2002 the American Physical Society named the work the most outstanding introductory physics text of the 20th century.

He received the Oersted Medal (1974), the highest award given by the American Association of Physics Teachers, and was president of that society from 1986 to 1990. As well as being a Fulbright Scholar, he was also an honorary research fellow and visiting professor at Harvard University (1964–65). Other awards include that of being an honorary visiting professor to the People's Republic of China (in 1981 and 1985), the Exxon Foundation Award for Outstanding Teaching (1954), the RPI Distinguished Faculty Award (1971), Outstanding Educator of the Year (1972), a fellow of the American Physical Society and of the American Association for the Advancement of Science, and a member of the Phi Beta Kappa and Sigma Xi honorary societies.

Upon Resnick's retirement in 1993, he was RPI's commencement speaker. A special nationally sponsored International Meeting in Physics Education was held in his honor. Rensselaer created the Robert Resnick Center for Physics Education, and the "Robert Resnick Lecture" in which a prominent scientist visits the school. Well known past speakers have included Leon Lederman in 2002 and Kip Thorne in 2005. He was inducted into Rensselaer's Hall of Fame in 2003. He died on January 29, 2014, at his home in Pittsburgh, Pennsylvania.

Positions held

- President's Fund Scholar at Johns Hopkins University (1946–49)
- Faculty of Physics, University of Pittsburgh (1949–56)
- Professor, Rensselaer Polytechnic Institute (c. 1956 – 1974)
- Edward P. Hamilton Distinguished Professor of Science Education at RPI (1974–93)
- Professor emeritus at RPI (1993–)
- Board of National Commission on College Physics (1960–68)
- Advisory board project Physical Science for Non-Scientists (1964–68)
- Co-director for the national project on Physics Demonstration Experiments (1962–70)
- Advisory editor, John Wiley & Sons publishers (1967–1983)
- Chairman Interdisciplinary Science Curriculum, RPI (1973–1988)
- President of American Association of Physics Teachers (1986–89)

== Bibliography ==
- Halliday, David; Resnick, Robert; Walker, Jearl (2021). Fundamentals of Physics (12th ed.). John Wiley & Sons. ISBN 978-1-119-77351-1.
- Introduction to Special Relativity, John Wiley & Sons, 1968
- Basic Concepts in Relativity and Early Quantum Theory, John Wiley & Sons, 1972
- Eisberg, Robert Martin; Resnick, Robert (1985). Quantum Physics of Atoms, Molecules, Solids, Nuclei and Particles (2nd ed.). John Wiley & Sons. ISBN 978-0-471-87373-0 – via Internet Archive.
