= Christophe Caloz =

Swiss-Canadian engineer (born 1969)

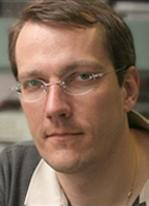
- Born: 8 May 1969 (age 57); Sierre, Valais, Switzerland
- Education: École Polytechnique Fédérale de Lausanne
- Known for: Metamaterials; Smart antennas; Nanoelectronics; Analog signal processing
- Awards: UCLA Chancellor's Award for Postdoctoral Research (2004); IEEE MTT-S Outstanding Young Engineer Award (2007); IEEE Fellowship (2010); E.W.R. Steacie Fellowship (2013); Urgel-Archambault Award (2013); Thomson Reuters Highly Cited Researcher (2014); Optica Fellowship (2020)
- Scientific career
- Fields: Electrical engineering, physics
- Workplaces: Polytechnique Montréal; KU Leuven
- Thesis: Contribution to the study of photonic crystals for microwave and millimeter-wave applications (2000)

Christophe Caloz (born May 8, 1969, Sierre, Switzerland), is a researcher and professor of electrical engineering and physics at KU Leuven. He graduated from the École Polytechnique Fédérale de Lausanne in Lausanne, Switzerland, where he received a Diploma of electrical engineering in telecommunications in 1995 and a Ph.D. in electromagnetics (photonic crystals) in 2000. From 2001 to 2004, he was a Postdoctoral Research Engineer at the Microwave Electronics Laboratory of University of California at Los Angeles. He was then a professor and a Canada Research Chair at the École Polytechnique de Montréal until 2019, before joining KU Leuven where he is the director of the Meta Research Group.

== Research ==
Caloz has done pioneering contributions to the field of electromagnetic metamaterials and smart antennas over the past decade. His most recent advances in these areas include magnetless non-reciprocal metamaterials and electronically steered leaky-wave antennas for enhanced Wifi MIMO systems. In the past few years, he discovered giant Faraday rotation in graphene and subsequently demonstrated novel microwave and terahertz devices. Moreover, he introduced the paradigm of Radio Analog Signal Processing (R-ASP), based novel dispersive delay structures that he called "phasers", which bear great promise to next-generation wireless communication systems.

== Professional activities ==
Caloz is a Distinguished Lecturer and AdCom Member of the IEEE Antennas and Propagation Society (AP-S) Member of the IEEE Microwave Theory and Techniques Society (MTT-S) Technical Committees MTT-15 (Microwave Field Theory) and MTT-25 (RF Nanotechnology), a Speaker of the MTT-15 Speaker Bureau, the Chair of the Commission D (Electronics and Photonics) of the Canadian Union de Radio Science Internationale (URSI) and an MTT-S representative at the IEEE Nanotechnology Council (NTC).

== Honors and awards ==
Caloz received several awards, including the UCLA Chancellor's Award for Post-doctoral Research in 2004, the MTT-S Outstanding Young Engineer Award in 2007, the E.W.R. Steacie Memorial Fellowship in 2013, and many best paper awards with his students. He has been an IEEE Fellow since 2010 and an Optica Fellow since 2020. He is also in Thomson Reuters' list of Highly Cited Researchers, which is composed of the 3,200 most influential scientists of the world in all disciplines.
