= Shirley Chiang =

American microscopist

Shirley Chiang is an American microscopist focused on the high-resolution imaging of surfaces, including the use of scanning tunneling microscopy and low-energy electron microscopy, and known for capturing the first image showing the ring structure of benzene molecules. She is a professor at the University of California, Davis, in the Department of Physics and Astronomy, and editor-in-chief of the MDPI journal Nanomaterials.

== Education and career ==
Chiang graduated from Harvard University in 1976, and earned her Ph.D. at the University of California, Berkeley in 1983. She became a researcher for IBM Research in their Almaden Research Center in San Jose, California from 1983 until 1994. It was at IBM, in 1988, that she captured the first image of individual benzene molecules, using a scanning tunneling microscope to view benzene attached in a single-molecule-thick layer to a rhodium crystal.

In 1994, she took her present position at the University of California, Davis. She was department chair from 2003 to 2008, and has also served as a faculty assistant to the vice provost for academic affairs.

== Recognition ==
Chiang was named a Fellow of the American Physical Society (APS) in 1994, after a nomination from the APS Division of Chemical Physics, "for advances in real space imaging of surface structure by scanning tunneling and force microscopies, especially molecular identification, imaging of metals and alloys, and atomic-scale frictional forces". She became a fellow of the American Vacuum Society in 2006, and a fellow of the American Association for the Advancement of Science in 2008.

She was a 2001 winner of the UC Davis Academic Senate Distinguished Teaching Award.
