= Jiming Song =

Jiming Song from Iowa State University, Ames, IA was named Fellow of the Institute of Electrical and Electronics Engineers (IEEE) in 2014 for contributions to algorithms in computational electromagnetics.
