= Optical Waves in Layered Media =

Textbook by Pochi Yeh

Optical Waves in Layered Media is a textbook for optics courses in electrical engineering or applied physics. The book focuses on physics theory more than practical application. General topical coverage is divided into five parts beginning with electromagnetic theory. It then covers isotropic layered thin films, anisotropic and inhomogeneous media including crystals and birefringence, and guided waves using layered media. Currently, with more than 5,500 citations, this book is highly cited. The book was first published by John Wiley & Sons in 1988 and has been reprinted several times, with the last reprint in 2005.

The book is written by physicist Pochi Yeh, who received his PhD in 1971 from the California Institute of Technology. He then obtained a position at Rockwell International Science Center in Thousand Oaks, California. In 1989 he became a member of the faculty at UC Santa Barbara.
