= David Halliday (physicist) =

American physicist (1916–2010)

- Born: March 3, 1916
- Died: April 2, 2010 (aged 94); Maple Falls, Washington
- Education: University of Pittsburgh
- Known for: University teaching of physics and co-author of a classic textbook of university physics
- Scientific career
- Fields: Physics
- Workplaces: University of Pittsburgh; MIT Radiation Lab

David Halliday (March 3, 1916 – April 2, 2010) was an American physicist known for his physics textbooks, Physics and Fundamentals of Physics, which he wrote with Robert Resnick. Both textbooks have been in continuous use since 1960 and are available in more than 47 languages.

Halliday attended the University of Pittsburgh both as an undergraduate student and a graduate student, receiving his Ph.D. in physics in 1941. During World War II, he worked at the MIT Radiation Lab developing radar techniques. In 1946 he returned to Pittsburgh as an assistant professor and spent the rest of his career there. In 1955, he published Introductory Nuclear Physics, which became a classic text and was translated into four languages. The book was continued and expanded in 1987 by Kenneth Krane, see the Bibliography.

In 1951 Halliday became the department chair, a position he held until 1962.

His book Physics has been used widely and is considered by many to have revolutionized physics education. Now in its twelfth edition in a two-volume set revised by Jearl Walker, and under the title Fundamentals of Physics, it is still highly regarded. It is noted for its clear standardized diagrams, very thorough but highly readable pedagogy, outlook into modern physics, and challenging, thought provoking problems. In 2002 the American Physical Society named the work the most outstanding introductory physics text of the 20th century.

Halliday died at the age of 94 on April 2, 2010. He was living in Maple Falls, Washington. His doctoral students included John Wheatley.

== Bibliography ==
- Krane, Kenneth S. (1987). Introductory Nuclear Physics. Wiley. ISBN 978-0-471-80553-3.
