= Matthew N.O. Sadiku =

Nigerian academic

Matthew Nojimu Olanipekun Sadiku from the Prairie View A&M University, Cypress, TX was named Fellow of the Institute of Electrical and Electronics Engineers (IEEE) in 2013 "for contributions to computational electromagnetics and engineering education".

He is a co-author of the textbook Fundamental of Electric Circuits with Charles K. Alexander.

== See also ==
- List of textbooks in electromagnetism
