= Artech House =

American book publisher

- Parent company: Horizon House Publications
- Founded: 1969; 57 years ago
- Country of origin: United States
- Headquarters location: Norwood, Massachusetts
- Publication types: Books, software
- Nonfiction topics: science and engineering
- Official website: artechhouse.com

Artech House (a.k.a. Artech House Publishers) is an American book publisher of professional scientific and engineering books. It is located in Norwood, Massachusetts, United States and has its European office in London, United Kingdom.

Artech House is a subsidiary of Horizon House Publications, Inc.

== Topics published ==
Artech specializes in books about microwaves and radar, GNSS, power engineering, space engineering, electronic warfare, signal processing, and other communications-related topics.
