= Jearl Walker =

American physicist and author

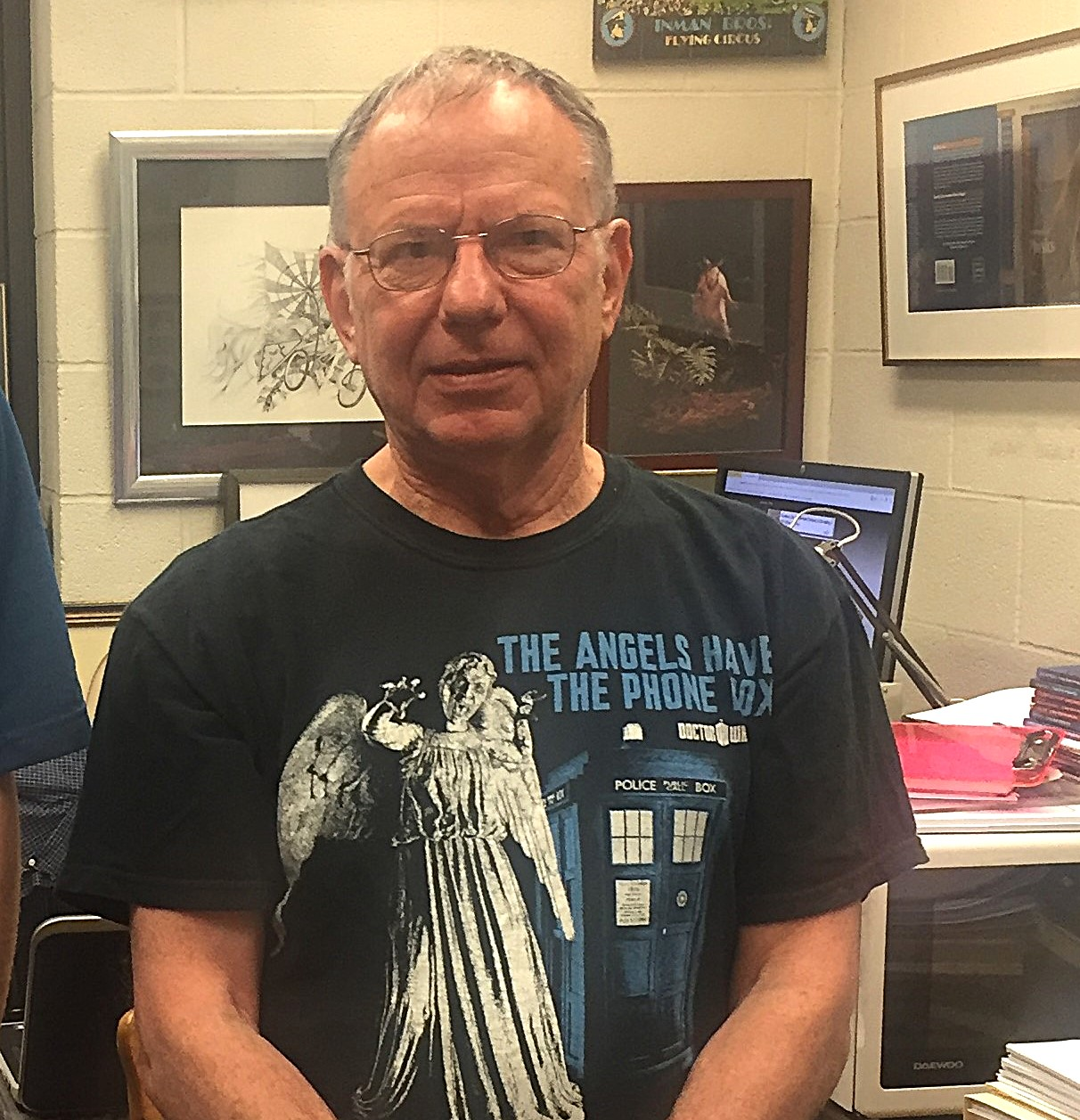
- Dr. Jearl D. Walker, Physicist
- Born: 1945 (age 80–81); Pensacola, Florida, U.S.
- Education: Massachusetts Institute of Technology; University of Maryland
- Known for: The Amateur Scientist column The Flying Circus of Physics
- Awards: Outstanding Teaching Award (Cleveland State University College of Science)
- Scientific career
- Fields: Physics
- Workplaces: Cleveland State University

Jearl Dalton Walker (born 1945) is an American physicist noted for his book The Flying Circus of Physics, first published in 1975; the second edition was published in June 2006. He teaches physics at Cleveland State University.

Walker has also revised and edited the textbook Fundamentals of Physics (now in its 12th edition) with David Halliday and Robert Resnick.

Walker is a well-known popularizer of physics, and appeared on The Tonight Show Starring Johnny Carson. Walker is known for his physics demonstrations, which have included sticking his hand in molten lead, walking barefoot over hot coals, lying on a bed of nails, and pouring freezing-cold liquid nitrogen in his mouth to demonstrate various principles of physics. Such demonstrations are included in his PBS series, Kinetic Karnival, produced by WVIZ in Cleveland, Ohio.

Walker was born in Pensacola, Florida, and grew up in Fort Worth, Texas. He graduated with a degree in physics from the Massachusetts Institute of Technology in 1967. He received his Ph.D. from the University of Maryland in 1973.

Walker authored The Amateur Scientist column in Scientific American magazine from 1978 to 1988. During the latter part of this period, he had been the Chairman of the Physics Department at Cleveland State University. He appeared regularly around this time on the long-running CBC radio science program Quirks and Quarks.

From 1981 to 1982 he hosted The Kinetic Karnival of Jearl Walker, a six-episode series for PBS syndication in the US. In each 30-minute program he performed humorous demonstrations before a live audience. The show was distributed to schools as a teaching aide.

He is the first recipient, in 2005, of the Outstanding Teaching Award from Cleveland State University's College of Science. The College's Faculty Affairs Committee selected Walker as the first honoree based on his contributions to science education over the last 30 years. The award was thereafter named "The Jearl Walker Outstanding Teaching Award" in his honor.
