= IEEE Electromagnetics Award =

- Awarded for: Outstanding contributions to electromagnetics in theory, application, or education
- Presented by: Institute of Electrical and Electronics Engineers
- First award: 1996
- Website: IEEE Electromagnetics Award

The IEEE Electromagnetics Award was established by the IEEE Board of Directors in 1996. This award is presented for outstanding contributions to electromagnetics theory, application or education.

It may be presented to an individual only.

Recipients of this award receive a bronze medal, certificate and honorarium.

== Recipients ==
- 2027: Zoya Popović
- 2026: John L. Volakis
- 2025: George V. Eleftheriades
- 2024: Kamal Sarabandi
- 2023: John Bandler
- 2022: Arthur D. Yaghjian
- 2021: Constantine A. Balanis
- 2020: Tapan Kumar Sarkar
- 2019: Richard W. Ziolkowski
- 2018: Tatsuo Itoh
- 2017: Weng Cho Chew
- 2016: Giorgio Franceschetti
- 2015: Donald R. Wilton
- 2014: Allen Taflove
- 2013: Leung Tsang
- 2012: Nader Engheta
- 2011: Yahya Rahmat-Samii
- 2010: Thomas B. A. Senior
- 2009: Kenneth K. Mei
- 2008: Werner Wiesbeck
- 2007: Carl Edward Baum
- 2006: Raj Mittra
- 2005: Clayton R. Paul
- 2004: Jin Au Kong
- 2003: Leopold B. Felsen
- 2002: Robert C. Hansen
- 2001: Fawwaz T. Ulaby
- 2000: Roger F. Harrington
- 1999: Robert E. Collin
