= Fernando Teixeira =

Electrical engineer and academic

- Born: Fernando Lisboa Teixeira
- Education: Pontifical Catholic University of Rio de Janeiro; University of Illinois Urbana-Champaign
- Known for: Contributions to computational electromagnetics
- Scientific career
- Fields: Electrical engineering
- Workplaces: Research Laboratory of Electronics; Ohio State University
- Thesis: Novel concepts for differential-equation-based electromagnetic field simulations (1999)
- Doctoral advisor: Weng Cho Chew
- Other academic advisors: Jin Au Kong
- Website: u.osu.edu/teixeira.5

Fernando Lisboa Teixeira is a Brazilian American electrical engineer and academic, who is a Professor of Electrical and Computer Engineering at Ohio State University and Director of the ElectroScience Laboratory. Best known for his contributions to computational electromagnetics, he was named a Fellow of the Institute of Electrical and Electronics Engineers in 2015 "for contributions to time-domain electromagnetic techniques and applications."

Teixeira received bachelor's and master's degrees from Pontifical Catholic University of Rio de Janeiro in 1991 and 1995. From 1992 to 1996, he worked in the Brazilian defense and satellite communications industries as an engineer. He received his doctoral degree from University of Illinois Urbana-Champaign in 1999 under the supervision of Weng Cho Chew; his dissertation focused on the development of new algorithms for electromagnetic simulations. From 1999 to 2000, he was a postdoctoral associate at Research Laboratory of Electronics at Massachusetts Institute of Technology, where he worked on remote sensing problems. In 2000, he joined Ohio State University as a faculty member.

Teixeira's research interests include computational electromagnetics, computational plasma physics, remote sensing, and antennas and propagation. He is the recipient of IEEE Microwave Outstanding Young Engineer Award (2010), and IEEE Antennas and Propagation Society Chen-To Tai Distinguished Educator Award (2026). Being a member of Commissions B and F of International Union of Radio Science, he served as the associate editor for IEEE Antennas and Wireless Propagation Letters and IET Microwaves, Antennas and Propagation.

== Selected publications ==
Books

- Teixeira, Fernando L., ed. (2001). Geometric Methods in Computational Electromagnetics. Progress In Electromagnetics Research. Vol. 32. Cambridge, MA: EMW Publishing. ISBN 09668143-6-3.
- Levis, Curt A.; Johnson, Joel T.; Teixeira, Fernando L. (2010). Radiowave Propagation: Physics and Applications. Hoboken, NJ: John Wiley & Sons. ISBN 978-0470542958.
- Kindervatter, Timothy H.; Teixeira, Fernando L. (2022). Tropospheric and Ionospheric Effects on Global Navigation Satellite Systems. Hoboken, NJ: Wiley-IEEE Press. ISBN 978-1119863069.

Journal articles

- Teixeira, F. L.; Chew, W. C. (November 1997). "Systematic Derivation of Anisotropic PML Absorbing Media in Cylindrical and Spherical Coordinates". IEEE Microwave and Guided Wave Letters. 7 (11): 371–373. doi:10.1109/75.641424.
- Teixeira, F. L.; Chew, W. C. (June 1998). "General Closed-Form PML Constitutive Tensors to Match Arbitrary Bianisotropic and Dispersive Linear Media". IEEE Microwave and Guided Wave Letters. 8 (6): 223–225. doi:10.1109/75.678571.
- Teixeira, F. L.; Chew, Weng Cho; Straka, M.; Oristaglio, M. L.; Wang, T. (November 1998). "Finite-Difference Time-Domain Simulation of Ground Penetrating Radar on Dispersive, Inhomogeneous, and Conductive Soils". IEEE Transactions on Geoscience and Remote Sensing. 36 (6): 1928–1937. doi:10.1109/36.729364.
- Teixeira, F. L.; Chew, W. C. (January 1999). "Lattice electromagnetic theory from a topological viewpoint". Journal of Mathematical Physics. 40 (1): 169–187. doi:10.1063/1.532767.
- Teixeira, Fernando L. (August 2008). "Time-Domain Finite-Difference and Finite-Element Methods for Maxwell Equations in Complex Media". IEEE Transactions on Antennas and Propagation. 56 (8): 2150–2166. doi:10.1109/TAP.2008.926767.
- Yoon, Woo-Jun; Jung, Kyung-Young; Liu, Jiwen; Duraisamy, Thirumalai; Revur, Rao; Teixeira, Fernando L.; Sengupta, Suvankar; Berger, Paul R. (January 2010). "Plasmon-enhanced optical absorption and photocurrent in organic bulk heterojunction photovoltaic devices using self-assembled layer of silver nanoparticles". Solar Energy Materials and Solar Cells. 94 (2): 128–132. doi:10.1016/j.solmat.2009.08.006.
- Li, Lianlin; Wang, Long Gang; Teixeira, Fernando L.; Liu, Che; Nehorai, Arye; Cui, Tie Jun (March 2019). "DeepNIS: Deep Neural Network for Nonlinear Electromagnetic Inverse Scattering". IEEE Transactions on Antennas and Propagation. 67 (3): 1819–1825. arXiv:1810.03990. doi:10.1109/TAP.2018.2885437.
