= Thomas B. A. Senior =

American engineer and academic (1928–2017)

- Born: June 26, 1928; Yorkshire, England
- Died: November 24, 2017 (aged 89); Ann Arbor, Michigan, U.S.
- Education: University of Manchester; University of Cambridge
- Known for: Contributions to the theory of electromagnetic scattering and diffraction
- Awards: IEEE Electromagnetics Award (2010)
- Scientific career
- Fields: Electrical engineering
- Workplaces: Radar Research and Development Establishment; University of Michigan
- Doctoral students: Ivan LaHaie; Kamal Sarabandi

Thomas B. A. Senior (June 26, 1928 – November 24, 2017) was a British-American electrical engineer and applied mathematician, who was professor emeritus at Department of Electrical Engineering and Computer Science at University of Michigan. He is best known for his contributions to the theories of electromagnetic and acoustic scattering, and diffraction.

== Biography ==
Thomas B. A. Senior was born in Yorkshire, England on June 26, 1928. He received his MSc and PhD degrees in applied mathematics from University of Manchester and University of Cambridge in 1950 and 1954, respectively. During his doctoral studies, he started working as a scientific officer at Radar Research and Development Establishment. In 1957, he emigrated to the United States with his wife Helen to continue his research at Willow Run Laboratories of University of Michigan. He was specifically recruited by Kip Siegel for his experience in the detection of V-2 rockets.

Becoming a full professor at University of Michigan in 1969, Senior served as the director of the Radiation Laboratory from 1974 to 1987, as well as its associate director from 1962 to 1994. During his tenure at University of Michigan, Senior also served at multiple administrative positions at the Department of Electrical Engineering and Computer Science. He also held numerous positions at International Union of Radio Science and served as its president from 1996 to 1999. He was named Arthur F. Thurnau Professor in 1991 and became an emeritus professor in 1998. He died on November 24, 2017, and was survived by his four children.

Senior's primary research area was the theories of and analytical methods for electromagnetic scattering and diffraction. In the 1960s, he has made contributions to the theory of radar cross section control, which has impacted the design of stealth aircraft in the United States. During his research in the 1970s, his research groups has recognized the electromagnetic interferences by wind turbines on electronic systems and introduced the procedures for electromagnetic compatibility testing of such systems. Due to the military involvement on the research at Radiation Laboratory of Michigan during his tenure, his lab was protested by a sit-in by Progressive Student Network in 1983. In addition to research, he has authored and co-authored three books on the topics of scattering and mathematical methods in electromagnetics.

In 2010, he received the IEEE Electromagnetics Award "for significant contributions to the advancement of electromagnetic diffraction and scattering theories." He is also the recipient of IEEE Millennium Medal, IEEE AP-S Distinguished Achievement Award and URSI Van der Pol Gold Medal. Being a life fellow of the IEEE, he was named as a fellow of the International Union of Radio Science in 2017.

== Selected publications ==
Books

- Bowman, J. J.; Senior, T. B. A.; Uslenghi, P. L. E. (1969). Electromagnetic and Acoustic Scattering by Simple Shapes (PDF). North-Holland Publishing Company.
- Senior, T. B. A. (1986). Mathematical Methods in Electrical Engineering. Cambridge University Press. ISBN 9781139165945.
- Senior, T. B. A.; Volakis, J. L. (1995). Approximate Boundary Conditions in Electromagnetics. IET. ISBN 9780852968499.

Journal articles

- Senior, T. B. A. (1952). "Diffraction by a semi-infinite metallic sheet". Proceedings of the Royal Society A. 213 (1115): 436–458. doi:10.1098/rspa.1952.0137.
- Senior, T. B. A. (1960). "Impedance boundary conditions for imperfectly conducting surfaces". Applied Scientific Research, Section B. 8: 418–436. doi:10.1007/BF02920074.
- Knott, E. F.; Senior, T. B. A. (1974). "Comparison of three high-frequency diffraction techniques". Proceedings of the IEEE. 62 (11): 1468–1474. doi:10.1109/PROC.1974.9653.
- Senior, T. B. A. (1975). "Half plane edge diffraction". Radio Science. 10 (6): 645–650. doi:10.1029/RS010i006p00645.
- Ulaby, Fawwaz T.; Held, Daniel; Donson, Myron C.; McDonald, Kyle C.; Senior, Thomas B. A. (1987). "Relating polarization phase difference of SAR signals to scene properties". IEEE Transactions on Geoscience and Remote Sensing. GE-25 (1): 83–92.
- Senior, T. B. A.; Sarabandi, K.; Ulaby, F. T. (1987). "Measuring and modeling the backscattering cross section of a leaf". Radio Science. 22 (6): 1109–1116. doi:10.1029/RS022i006p01109.
- Senior, Thomas B. A.; Volakis, John L. (1987). "Sheet simulation of a thin dielectric layer". Radio Science. 22 (7): 1261–1272. doi:10.1029/RS022i007p01261.
- Senior, T. B. A.; Sarabandi, K.; Natzke, J. R. (1990). "Scattering by a narrow gap". IEEE Transactions on Antennas and Propagation. 38 (7): 1102–1110. doi:10.1109/8.55624.
