= Zoya Popović =

Serbian-American electrical engineer

Zoya Popovic
- Born: 1962 (age 63–64)
- Education: University of Belgrade; California Institute of Technology
- Awards: IEEE Fellow (2002); IEEE Electromagnetics Award (2027)
- Scientific career
- Fields: Electrical engineering
- Workplaces: University of Colorado Boulder
- Thesis: Grid oscillators (1990)
- Doctoral advisor: David Rutledge

Zorana Basta (Zoya) Popović is a Yugoslav-American electrical engineer, a distinguished professor and Lockheed Martin Endowed Chair in RF Engineering in the Department of Electrical, Computer and Energy Engineering at the University of Colorado Boulder. Her research involves radio and microwave engineering, including wireless communication, millimeter wave scanners, radio frequency power transmission, and the use of rectennas to harvest radio-frequency energy.

== Education and career ==
Popović was born in Belgrade in 1962, and earned an engineering diploma in 1985 at the University of Belgrade, Yugoslavia (now Serbia). She went to the California Institute of Technology for graduate study in electrical engineering, earning a master's degree in 1986 and completing a Ph.D. in 1990, under the supervision of David Rutledge.

She has been on the faculty of the University of Colorado Boulder since 1990. She became a full professor there in 1998, was given the Hudson Moore Jr. Professorship in 2006, was named as a distinguished professor in 2010, and was given the Lockheed Martin Endowed Chair in RF Engineering in 2017.

== Book ==
With her father, Branko Popović, Popović is the coauthor of the textbook Introductory Electromagnetics (Prentice-Hall, 2000). She then published Active and Quasi-Optical Arrays for Solid-State Power Combining in 2008.

== Recognitions ==
Popović was named as an IEEE Fellow in 2002, "for contributions to the development of active antenna arrays and quasi-optical power combining techniques". She became a foreign member of the Serbian Academy of Sciences and Arts in 2006. She was elected in 2022 to the National Academy of Engineering, "for developing high-efficiency microwave transmitters and active antenna arrays for wireless communication systems and for engineering education".

The International Union of Radio Science (URSI) gave Popović their Young Scientist Award in 1993 and their Issac Koga Gold Medal in 1996, "for contributions to the field of active microwave circuits, in particular, the original demonstration of the planar grid oscillator, as well as continuing efforts with quasi optical amplifiers and active antennas". Popovic was the recipient of the 2000 Humboldt Research Award for Senior U.S. Scientists from the German Alexander von Humboldt Stiftung. She was the 2001 recipient of the Frederick Emmons Terman Award of the American Society for Engineering Education. The IEEE Microwave Theory and Technology Society gave Popović their Distinguished Educator Award in 2013, "for outstanding contributions as a teacher, mentor, and role model for students in the microwave profession", citing her many successful doctoral students and her textbook, among other accomplishments. She was also the recipient of the 2015 IEEE Rudolf E. Henning Distinguished Mentoring award.

Charles III University of Madrid gave her an honorary doctorate in 2022.

She received the 2027 IEEE Electromagnetics Award "for contributions to microwave and millimeter-wave circuit designs, particularly power amplifiers, power-combining and wireless power systems".
