= Ulaby =

Ulaby is a surname. Notable people with the surname include:

- Fawwaz T. Ulaby, Syrian professor
- Neda Ulaby (born c. 1970), American reporter
