= Levent Gürel =

Turkish scientist (born 1964)

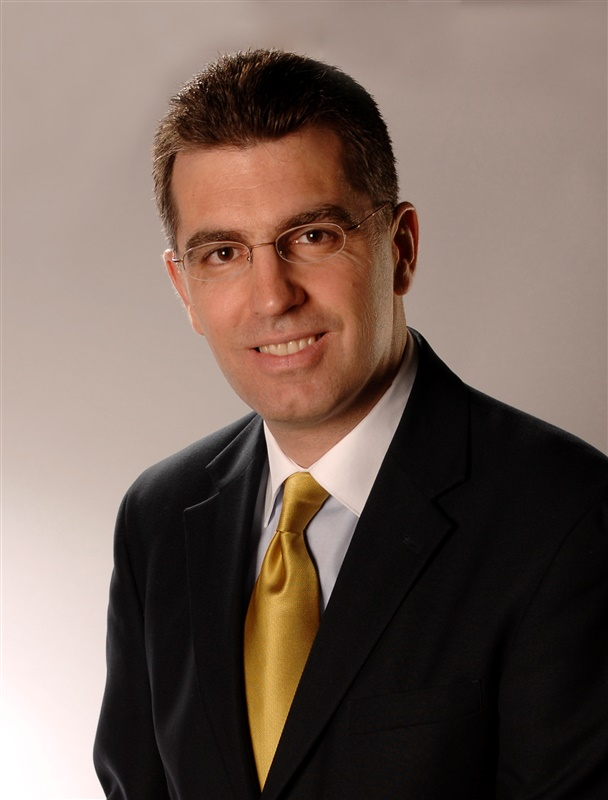
- Born: 1964 (age 61–62); İzmir, Turkey
- Citizenship: Turkey
- Education: University of Illinois at Urbana–Champaign Middle East Technical University
- Awards: IEEE Distinguished Lecturer IEEE Fellow 2015 Harrington-Mittra Award
- Scientific career
- Fields: Electrical Engineering Electromagnetics
- Workplaces: ABAKUS Computing Technologies
- Doctoral advisor: Weng Cho Chew

Levent Gürel (born 1964) is a Turkish scientist and electrical engineer. He was the director of Computational Electromagnetics Research Center (BiLCEM) and a professor in the Department of Electrical and Electronics Engineering at the Bilkent University, Turkey until November 2014. Currently, he is serving as an adjunct professor at the University of Illinois Urbana-Champaign, Department of Electrical and Computer Engineering. He is also serving as the founder and CEO of ABAKUS Computing Technologies.

== Early life and education ==
Gürel was born in 1964 in İzmir, Turkey. He received a B.Sc. degree from the Middle East Technical University (METU) in Ankara in 1986, and M.S. and Ph.D. degrees from the University of Illinois at Urbana-Champaign (UIUC) in 1988 and 1991. All his qualifications are in electrical engineering.

== Career ==
From 1991 to 1994, Gürel worked as a research staff member in the Thomas J. Watson Research Center of the International Business Machines (IBM) Corporation, Yorktown Heights, New York. During his three-year stint at IBM, Gürel conducted research in the areas of electromagnetic modeling, fast solvers, electromagnetic compatibility (EMC), electronic packaging, and interconnect modeling, and the use of microwave processes for manufacturing and testing electronic circuits.

Gürel joined Bilkent University in Ankara in 1994 as a faculty member. He served as a professor in the Department of Electrical and Electronics Engineering.

During his sabbatical leaves, Gürel was a visiting associate professor at the Center for Computational Electromagnetics (CCEM) of the UIUC for one semester in 1997 and a visiting professor during 2003–2005. He was appointed as an adjunct professor in the Department of Electrical and Computer Engineering of UIUC after 2005.

Gürel (IEEE Fellow) is elected as a distinguished lecturer of the IEEE Antennas and Propagation Society for 2011–2014.

Levent Gürel founded the Computational Electromagnetics Research Center (BiLCEM) at Bilkent University in 2005 and he served as the founding director of BiLCEM.

From 2012 to present, Gürel is serving as a consultant at the Schlumberger-Doll Research Center, Cambridge, MA.

Currently, he is the founder and CEO of ABAKUS Computing Technologies.

== Research ==
Computational electromagnetics (CEM), fast solvers, parallel computing, and electromagnetic theory are Prof. Levent Gürel's main lines of research. He is interested in the development of fast algorithms for the solution of extremely large integral-equation problems arising in CEM. Such a powerful computational capability is applied to the solution of problems with unprecedented complexities in the areas of electromagnetic scattering and radiation, antennas and radars, metamaterials, optical and imaging systems, frequency-selective surfaces, nanotechnology, and high-speed electronic circuits. Electromagnetic compatibility (EMC) and electromagnetic interference (EMI) are also among his research interests. Prof. Gürel is also interested in the solution of inverse problems, subsurface scattering, ground penetrating radars, and medical imaging with microwaves.

By implementing a fully parallelized version of the multilevel fast multipole algorithm (MLFMA), Gürel's research group has been solving the world's largest integral-equation problems since 2006. In 2013, they accomplished the solution of dense matrix equations involving as many as 550 million unknowns. In 2015, they presented scattering results which requires solution of 1.3 billion unknowns.

== Awards and honors ==
Among the recognitions of Gürel's accomplishments, the two prestigious awards from the Turkish Academy of Sciences (TUBA) in 2002 and the Scientific and Technological Research Council of Turkey (TUBITAK) in 2003 are the most notable.

He is a Fellow of IEEE, a fellow of The Applied Computational Electromagnetics Society (ACES), and a fellow of The Electromagnetics Academy (EMA).

He was awarded with the 2015 Harrington-Mittra Award in Computational Electromagnetics "for pioneering contributions to the accurate solution of large-scale electromagnetic problems via integral equations, parallel computing, and fast algorithms" by the IEEE Antennas and Propagation Society.

== Professional activities ==
Gürel is a member of the United States National Committee (USNC) of the International Union of Radio Science (URSI) and the Chairman of Commission E (Electromagnetic Noise and Interference) of URSI Turkey National Committee. He served as a member of the General Assembly of the European Microwave Association (EuMA) during 2006-2008.

He is currently serving as an associate editor for ACES Express, Applied Computational Electromagnetics Society (ACES), ACES Journal, Applied Computational Electromagnetics Society (ACES), IET Microwaves, Antennas & Propagation, Radio Science, IEEE Antennas and Wireless Propagation Letters, Journal of Electromagnetic Waves and Applications (JEMWA), and Progress in Electromagnetics Research (PIER).

Gürel was the chairman of the AP/MTT/ED/EMC Chapter of the IEEE Turkey Section in 2000-2003. He founded the IEEE EMC Chapter in Turkey in 2000. He served as the co-chairman of the 2003 IEEE International Symposium on Electromagnetic Compatibility. He is the organizer and General Chair of the CEM’07, CEM’09, CEM'11, CEM'13, and CEM'15 Computational Electromagnetics International Workshops held in 2007, 2009, 2011, 2013, and 2015.

Gurel is a member of the board of trustees of Izmir University of Economics.

He is one of the writers of the book The Multilevel Fast Multipole Algorithm (MLFMA) for Solving Large-Scale Computational Electromagnetics Problems published from Wiley.
