= Gürel =

Gürel is a Turkish surname. Notable people with the surname include:

- Aysel Gürel (1929–2008), Turkish lyricist and actress
- Ediz Gürel (born 2008), Turkish chess player
- Hıdır Gürel (1920–1956), known as Âşık İbretî, Turkish ashik, poet and folk singer
- Levent Gürel (born 1964), Turkish scientist and electrical engineer
- Özge Gürel (born 1987), Turkish actress
- Seden Gürel (born 1965), Turkish singer
- Şükrü Sina Gürel (born 1950), Turkish diplomat and political figure
