= Progress in Electromagnetics Research =

- Discipline: Electromagnetic theory and applications
- Language: English
- Edited by: Weng Cho Chew, Sailing He

Publication details
- Former name(s): Electromagnetic Waves
- History: 1989-present
- Publisher: EMW Publishing
- Open access: Yes
- Impact factor: 9.3 (2024)

Standard abbreviations
- ISO 4: Prog. Electromagn. Res.

Indexing
- ISSN: 1070-4698 (print); 1559-8985 (web)
- OCLC no.: 63284447
- Electromagnetic Waves
- ISSN: 1070-4698

Links
- Journal homepage

Progress in Electromagnetics Research is a peer-reviewed open access scientific journal covering all aspects of electromagnetic theory and applications. It was established in 1989 as Electromagnetic Waves. The editors-in-chief are Weng Cho Chew (Purdue University) and Sailing He (Royal Institute of Technology). Jin Au Kong was the founding editor-in-chief.

== Abstracting and indexing ==
The journal is abstracted and indexed by the Science Citation Index Expanded, Current Contents, Inspec, Scopus, and Compendex. It is also a member of CrossRef. According to the Journal Citation Reports, the journal had a 2019 impact factor of 1.898. However, it was not listed in 2012 because of "anomalous citation patterns resulting in a significant distortion of the Journal Impact Factor, so that the rank does not reflect the journal's citation performance in the literature".
