= Robert E. Collin =

Canadian-American engineer and professor (1928–2010)

- Born: 24 October 1928; Donalda, Alberta, Canada
- Died: 29 November 2010 (aged 82); Ohio, U.S.
- Citizenship: Canada, U.S.
- Education: University of Saskatchewan; Imperial College London
- Known for: The fundamental contributions to antenna theory, microwave engineering, and applied electromagnetic theory
- Awards: Member, National Academy of Engineering(1990); IEEE Antennas & Propagation Society Distinguished Career Award (1992); IEEE Schelkunoff Prize Paper Award (1992); IEEE Electromagnetics Award (1999); IEEE Third Millennium Medal Award (2000)
- Scientific career
- Fields: Electrical engineering
- Workplaces: Case Western Reserve University

Robert Emmanuel Collin (24 October 1928 – 29 November 2010) was a Canadian American electrical engineer, university professor, and life fellow of the IEEE, known for his fundamental contributions in applied electromagnetism.

== Biography ==
Collin was born on 24 October 1928 in the small town of Donalda, Alberta, Canada. He received an undergraduate degree from the University of Saskatchewan and a PhD in electrical engineering from University of London (Imperial College). He worked at the Canadian Armament and Research Development Establishment on guided missile antennas, radomes and radar system evaluations.

Collin taught at Case Western Reserve University between 1958 and 1997. His served stints as the electrical engineering department chair and the interim dean of engineering. He was a distinguished visiting professor at Ohio State University and was a visiting professor at universities in Brazil, China and Germany.

Collin was elected to the National Academy of Engineering in 1990.

== Researches ==
Collin made fundamental contributions to antenna theory, microwave engineering, and applied electromagnetism. In 1999 he received the IEEE award for his "significant contributions to electromagnetics as a multi-disciplinary engineering profession." His researches covered numerous areas of applied electromagnetics like quarter-wave transformers, waves in plasmas, small antennas limitations, rough media scattering, small apertures coupling, dyadic Green functions, missile guidance antennas, radomes, radar systems evaluation, superconducting antennas, and many other areas. Among his students, Collin was viewed as remarkable for his ability to recount the uttermost details of lengthy mathematical proofs from memory. He was recognized as an outstanding scholar of microwave and radar engineering and relativistic electrodynamics based on tensor calculus. During the Korean War era, Collin achieved many important engineering breakthroughs for His Majesty's and Her Majesty's governments.

In addition to his researches, he is widely known for his prominent textbooks on electromagnetic waves, microwave engineering, and antennas. One of the most notable is his first book Field Theory of Guided Waves, an advanced graduate textbook that Collin completed most of it when he was 29. This textbook have been noted for its comprehensiveness and rigorous mathematical treatments and recommended by John David Jackson as one of the best references regarding the "sources and excitation of oscillations in waveguides and cavities." In this textbook Collin incorporated the concept of radiation reaction into Hans Bethe's theory of small aperture coupling, resulting in the development of an analogous self-consistent circuital model for coupling between different regions in waveguides and cavities which was a limitation in Bethe's original theory. Another important classic textbook of Collin is Foundations for Microwave Engineering that its first and second editions published in 1966 and 1992 respectively. The final editions of both of these two textbooks were published by IEEE as classic textbooks in the collection of The IEEE Series on Electromagnetic Wave Theory. Collin also co-authored with Robert Plonsey an undergraduate level textbook Principles and Applications of Electromagnetic Fields, authored an intermediate level textbook Antennas and Radiowave Propagation, co-edited with Francis Zucker an advanced level two-volume textbook Antenna Theory, and finally co-authored with Robert Hansen his last textbook Small Antenna Handbook which was published in 2011 after his death.

== Publications ==
=== Books ===
- Collin RE, Antennas and Radiowave Propagation, McGraw Hill, 1985.
- Collin RE, Field Theory of Guided Waves, 2nd ed, Wiley-IEEE, 1991.
- Collin RE, Foundations for Microwave Engineering, 2nd ed, Wiley-IEEE, 2001. (Note: IEEE classic reissue of the 1992 textbook published by McGraw Hill.)
- Collin RE, Zucker FJ, (Eds), Antenna Theory, 2 vols, McGraw Hill, 1969.
- Hansen RC, Collin RE, Small Antenna Handbook, Wiley-IEEE, 2011. (Note: Published posthumously.)
- Plonsey R; Collin RE, Principles and Applications of Electromagnetic Fields, McGraw Hill, 1961.

=== Articles ===
- Collin RE, "A Simple Artificial Anisotropic Dielectric Medium", IRE Transactions on Microwave Theory and Techniques, 6(2): 206-209, 1958.
- Collin RE, "Evaluation of antenna Q", IEEE Transactions on Antennas and Propagation, 12(1): 23-27, 1964.
- Collin RE, "Hertzian Dipole Radiating over a Lossy Earth or Sea: Some Early and Late 20th-Century Controversies", IEEE Antennas and Propagation Magazine, 46(2): 64-79, 2004.
- Collin RE, "Limitations of the Thévenin and Norton Equivalent Circuits for a Receiving Antenna", IEEE Antennas and Propagation Magazine, 45(2): 119-124, 2003.
- Collin RE, "Minimum Q of Small Antennas", Journal of Electromagnetic Waves and Applications, 12(10): 1369-1393, 1998.
- Collin RE, "On the Incompleteness of E and H Modes in Wave Guides", Canadian Journal of Physics, 51(11): 1135-1140, 1973.
- Collin RE, "The Optimum Tapered Transmission Line Matching Section", Proceedings of the IRE, 44(4): 539-548, 1956.
- Collin RE, "Theory and Design of Wide-Band Multisection Quarter-Wave Transformers", Proceedings of the IRE, 43(2): 179-185, 1955.
- Hansen RC, Collin RE, "A New Chu Formula for Q", IEEE Antennas and Propagation Magazine, 51(5): 38-41, 2009.
- Tai CT, Collin RE, "Radiation of a Hertzian Dipole Immersed in a Dissipative Medium", IEEE Transactions on Antennas and Propagation, 48(10): 1501-1506, 2000.
- Vesselle H, Collin RE, "The Signal-to-Noise Ratio of Nuclear Magnetic Resonance Surface Coils and Application to a Lossy Dielectric Cylinder Model—Part I: Theory", IEEE Transactions on Biomedical Engineering, 42(5): 497-506, 1995.
- Vesselle H, Collin RE, "The Signal-to-Noise Ratio of Nuclear Magnetic Resonance Surface Coils and Application to a Lossy Dielectric Cylinder Model—Part II: The Case of Cylindrical Window Coils", IEEE Transactions on Biomedical Engineering, 42(5): 507-520, 1995.

== Awards ==
- 1990: Member, National Academy of Engineering
- 1992: IEEE APS Distinguished Career Award; IEEE Schelkunoff Prize Paper Award
- 1999: IEEE Electromagnetics Award
- 2000: IEEE Third Millennium Medal

== See also ==
- List of textbooks in electromagnetism
