= Branko Popović =

Branko Popović may refer to:

- Branko Popović (painter) (1882–1944)
- Branko Popović (engineer) (1934–2002)
- Branko Popović (politician) (born 1975)
