= Plonsey =

Plonsey is a surname. Notable people with the surname include:

- Dan Plonsey (born 1958), American jazz saxophonist
- Robert Plonsey (1924–2015), American professor of Biomedical Engineering
