= David Rutledge =

David Rutledge may refer to:

- David Rutledge (engineer) (born 1952), professor of engineering
- David E. Rutledge, member of the Michigan House of Representatives
- David Rutledge (racing driver)
