= Mahta Moghaddam =

Iranian-American electrical and computer engineer

- Born: Iran
- Education: University of Kansas; University of Illinois at Urbana-Champaign
- Known for: Development of microwave sensing technologies
- Awards: 2019 National Academy of Engineering (NAE); 2017 Maseeh Entrepreneurship Prize Competition; 2016 NASA Honor Award; 2016 NASA Group Achievement Award
- Scientific career
- Fields: Electrical and computer engineering
- Workplaces: University of Southern California; University of Michigan
- Thesis: Forward and inverse scattering problems in the time domain (1991)
- Doctoral advisor: Weng Cho Chew

Mahta Moghaddam is an Iranian-American electrical and computer engineer and William M. Hogue Professor of Electrical Engineering in the Ming Hsieh Department of Electrical and Computer Engineering at the University of Southern California Viterbi School of Engineering. Moghaddam is also the president of the IEEE Antennas and Propagation Society and is known for developing sensor systems and algorithms for high-resolution characterization of the environment to quantify the effects of climate change. She also has developed innovative tools using microwave technology to visualize biological structures and target them in real-time with high-power focused microwave ablation.

== Early life and education ==
Moghaddam grew up in Iran with her sister, Bita Moghaddam, and her parents.

Moghaddam then moved to the United States in 1982 to start her undergraduate education at the University of Kansas. She graduated with a Bachelors of Science in Electrical Engineering in 1986 with the Highest Distinction. Continuing on in engineering and academia, Moghaddam pursued an M.S. in Electrical Engineering at the University of Illinois at Urbana-Champaign where she worked under the mentorship of Weng Cho Chew. Her thesis work explored the response of an eccentric dipole in cylindrical layered media.

After completing her master's degree in 1989, Moghaddam continued on under the mentorship of Weng Cho Chew at the University of Illinois at Urbana-Champaign and completed a PhD in Electrical Engineering. For her dissertation, Moghaddam designed a method to solve the 2 and ½ dimensional electromagnetic forward scattering problems in the time domain and used this method to develop a realistic model of the subsurface interface radar. Her thesis was titled “Forward and Inverse Scattering Problems in the Time Domain”.

== Career and research ==
=== Work at NASA Jet Propulsion Laboratory ===
After completing her PhD in 1991, Moghaddam began a position as a Senior Engineer in the Radar Science and Engineering Section of the NASA Jet Propulsion Laboratory in Pasadena, California. As the Systems Engineer for the Cassini Radar, she helped develop new radar based measurement technologies for subcanopy and subsurface characterization. These technologies allowed her to characterize soil and canopy moisture as well as permafrost using airborne synthetic aperture radar (AIRSAR). She found that using a classification algorithm to identify the predominant scattering mechanism, focusing on the branch layer, and subsequently deriving moisture content from a parametric model, allowed her to retrieve model parameters from AIRSAR data. This estimation algorithm allowed her to observe canopy moisture of the BOREAS forest over a six-month period. In 2000, Moghaddam published a paper looking at the subcanopy soil moisture content from AIRSAR data using similar approaches where she first found the predominant scattering mechanism and then validated the results based on ground measurements of soil and trunk moisture. She found that her estimated values were within 14% of the measured values, but taking into account measurement error on the ground and via radar, her results show that the estimations closely track the measurements. Moghaddam also helped use and verify the Cassini Radio Detection and Ranging system, meant to obtain images of planetary terrain.

=== Moghaddam's accomplishments at the University of Michigan ===
In 2003, Moghaddam joined the Electrical Engineering and Computer Science Faculty at the University of Michigan, Ann Arbor as an associate professor. Her lab focused on developing radar systems for subsurface characterization, mixed-mode high resolution medical imaging, and smart sensor webs for remote sensing data collection. She was appointed to tenured Associate Professor in 2006 and became a full professor of Electrical Engineering and Computer Science at the University of Michigan in 2009.

During her time at Michigan, Moghaddam remained on the NASA Earth Venture Airborne Radar Mission to build the instruments and algorithms to map the subsurface and root-zone. She also continued her efforts in creating tools to map soil moisture, and generally characterize Earth's land-cover which is critical for understanding and tracking climate change. Tracking soil moisture is important in modeling the global climate, according to Moghaddam, as it is essentially a report of the current state of energy exchange between the land and the atmosphere, and thus this measure of energy exchange can be used to inform how water, energy, and carbon are cycled throughout the globe.

Since Moghaddam also focused her research program on improved medical imaging technologies, in 2008 Moghaddam published her investigation of a new tool to better reconstruct 3D images using time-domain data. Her results represented a promising tool for detecting breast cancer. She further optimized this technology in 2010 to recover objects with minute contrasts as low as 10% to address the fact that breast cancers usually only have a 10% contrast with respect to glandular tissue.

=== Leadership and research at the University of Southern California ===
In 2012, Moghaddam was recruited to the University of Southern California to begin her role as a Professor of Electrical Engineering. She is now also the Director of New Research Initiatives at the Viterbi School of Engineering, the Head of Microwave Systems, Sensors, and Imaging Lab (MiXIL), and the Director of the USC Viterbi Center for Arid Climate Water Research (AWARE).

In 2017, Moghaddam was a critical member of the team that helped to map permafrost coverage in Alaska and Northern Canada to explore its rapid deterioration due to climate change. Moghaddam helped design a synthetic aperture radar instrument that sent pulses of polarized radio waves towards earth, hit permafrost, and bounced back in different polarizations. This data was then analyzed to determine how thick the thawed, or active layer, of soil is. As the permafrost thaws, it releases excessive amounts of carbon into the atmosphere overwhelming the carbon cycle and contribution to rapid accelerations in global warming and thus tracking these changes is of utmost importance.

==== Medical applications of thermal view monitoring ====
In 2017, Moghaddam was the co-founder and president of the start-up Thermal View Monitoring. The group designed an image guidance system that uses radio frequency waves to provide physicians with real-time, 3-dimensional temperature maps to identify cancers for destruction with ablation therapy. For their entrepreneurship, they won the top prize at the USC Viterbi Maseeh Entrepreneurship Prize Competition and their goal is to launch this product by 2021. Following up on this work, Moghaddam published a paper in 2018 proposing a similar method that continuously transmits and receives microwave signals to produce a heat map of the region, organ, body part, that will be operated on. This technology will enhance targeting and treating of brain diseases and disorders from tumors to epilepsy since it allows real-time monitoring during ablation preventing the need for further rounds of treatment.

==== Wireless sensory network systems ====
In 2020, Moghaddam and her graduate student, Negar Golestani, developed a novel wireless sensor network system to track and record human physical activity using magnetic induction instead of radio frequency. They integrated the magnetic induction system with machine learning techniques to be able to accurately detect a wide range of human motions, even under water. This innovative technology could be applied to not only typical wearable technologies for personal use but also for use in healthcare, natural disasters, and even underwater communication.

== Leadership and titles ==
In 2018, Moghaddam was elected president of the Institute of Electrical and Electronics Engineers (IEEE) Antennas and Propagation Society. The IEEE Antennas and Propagation Society is one of the largest IEEE societies. She served one year as a president elect from January 2019 until December 2019, and then started her term as president in January 2020. In 2019, Moghaddam was also inducted into the National Academy of Engineering (NAE). The USC Interim President, Wanda Austin, reported that her imagination in adapting microwave energy for the common good as allowed her to excel so dramatically in her career. One of her upcoming goals is to make USC a leader in the addressing issues of water scarcity by applying and adapting her radar mapping technologies further. Other leaderships roles and titles she has held/holds include:

- 2020 President of IEEE Antennas and Propagation Society (APS)
- 2019 President-elect of IEEE Antennas and Propagation Society (APS)
- 2019 National Academy of Engineering Inductee
- Science Chair for the JPL Team X (Advanced Mission Studies Team)
- USNC-URSI (Under the US National Academies) Member-at-Large, 2018-2020
- NASA Advisory Council, Subcommittee on Earth Science, 2010–2013, 2014-2016
- Science Team, NASA Soil Moisture Active/Passive (SMAP) mission, 2013–present
- Science Team, NASA CYGNSS mission, selected in 2018
- Chair, Special Awards Committee, IEEE-GRSS, 2015-2016
- Science Definition Team, NASA Soil Moisture Active/Passive (SMAP) mission, 2008–2013
- Chair, Algorithms Working Group, SMAP mission, 2008–2014
- Chair, Commission K, US National Committee of the International Union of Radio Science (URSI), 2015-2017 (Under U.S. National Academies)
- Alaska Satellite Facility, User Working Group, 2013–2016
- Vice-chair, Commission K, US National Committee of the International Union of Radio Science (URSI), 2012-2014 (Under U.S. National Academies)
- Chair, SMAP 2nd Algorithms Workshop, held March 2010
- Co-chair, SMAP Algorithms and Cal/Val Workshop, June 2009
- Co-chair, NASA ESTO Radar Technology Panel, 2003
- Chapter Chair, IEEE-GRS Southeastern Michigan, 2005–2012

=== Editorial services ===
- Editor-in-chief, IEEE Antennas and Propagation Magazine, 2015–present (Min Magazine Redesign Award Honorable Mention, 2016)
- Associate editor, IEEE Transactions on Geoscience and Remote Sensing, 2005-2013
- Guest co-editor, IEEE JSTARS, Special Issue on Microwave Remote Sensing for Land Hydrology Research and Applications, 2009
- Guest editor, IEEE Transactions on Instrumentation and Measurement, ICONIC07 Special Issue
- Associate editor, J. Electromagnetics Waves and Applications, 2008–present
- IEEE Instrumentation and Measurements Society, Outstanding Reviewer Award, 2014

== Awards and honors ==
- National Academy of Engineering (NAE), For the development of physics-based computational algorithms for mapping of subsurface characteristics. 2019
- President of IEEE Antennas and Propagation Society, 2019-2020
- IEEE-GRSS Distinguished Lecturer, 2017–present
- Distinguished Visiting Scholar, Monash University, Australia, November 2017.
- Maseeh Entrepreneurship Prize Competition, First place, for “Thermal View Monitoring” technology, 2017.
- NASA Honor Award: Outstanding Public Leadership Medal for “Outstanding Leadership in Advancement of Microwave Remote Sensing,” 2016.
- NASA Group Achievement Award: AirMOSS Implementation Team, PI Moghaddam (2016); AirMOSS is a NASA Earth Ventures Suborbital Mission, $25.8M funding, involving 5 universities and 7 government agencies and FFRDCs.
- NASA Group Achievement Award: Soil Moisture Active Passive (SMAP) Science Team (2016)
- NASA Group Achievement Award, SMAPVEX12, 2012
- University of Michigan Faculty Recognition Award, 2011.
- Outstanding Achievement Award, Electrical Engineering and Computer Science, University of Michigan (2010-11 AY)
- Fellow, IEEE (2008)
- Education Excellence Award, College of Engineering, The University of Michigan (2009)
- Outstanding Section Professional Award, IEEE Southeastern Michigan Section (2009)
- Elected member of USNC-URSI (under the National Academies) Commission B, Commission F, Commission
- NASA Certificate of Recognition: Dual low-frequency radar for soil moisture under vegetation and at-depth (2004)
- NASA Certificate of Recognition: Single-chip high-density FPGA implementation of the SAR azimuth prefilter (2003)
- NASA Certificate of Recognition: Dual frequency stacked-patch array for large aperture antenna feed (2004)
- Fellow of the Electromagnetics Academy (2001)
- NASA Certificate of Recognition: Cassini Program, Cassini Radar Team (1997)
- NASA Group Achievement Award: Cassini Program, Cassini Radar Team (1997)
- Member of Phi Kappa Phi, Tau Beta Pi, Eta Kappa Nu (Vice President, 1985–1986)

== Select publications ==
- Human activity recognition using magnetic induction-based motion signals and deep recurrent neural networks. 2020. N Golestani, M Moghaddam. Nature Communications 11 (1), 1-11
- Golestani, N., and M. Moghaddam, “Theoretical modeling and analysis of magnetic induction communication in wireless body area networks (WBANs),” IEEE J. Electromagnetics, RF and Microwaves in Medicine and Biology, March 2018, DOI 10.1109/JERM.2018.2810603.
- Chen, G., Stang, J., Haynes, M., Leuthardt, E., and Moghaddam, M., “Real-Time 3D Microwave Monitoring of Interstitial Thermal Therapy,” IEEE Transactions on Biomedical Engineering, March 2018.
- Yi, Y., Kimball, J. S., Chen, R., Moghaddam, M., Reichle, R. H., Mishra, U., Zona, D., and Oechel, W. C., “Characterizing permafrost soil active layer dynamics and sensitivity to landscape spatial heterogeneity in Alaska,” The Cryosphere Discuss., May 2017.
- Clewley, D., Whitcomb, J. B., Akbar, R., Silva, A. R., Berg, A., Adams, J. R., Caldwell, T., Entekhabi, D., and Moghaddam, M., “A Method for Upscaling In Situ Soil Moisture Measurements to Satellite Footprint Scale Using Random Forests,” IEEE Journal of Selected Topics in Applied Earth Observations and Remote Sensing, April 2017.
- Kim, SB, et al., “Surface soil moisture retrieval using the L-band synthetic aperture radar on-board the Soil Moisture Active Passive (SMAP) satellite and evaluation at core validation sites,” IEEE Trans. Geosci. Remote Sensing, vol. 55, no. 4, pp. 1897–1914, April 2017.
- Wang, Y., Stang, J., Yu, M., Tsvetkov, M., Wu, C.C., Qin, X., Chung, E., Moghaddam, M. and Wu, W., “Microwave Selective Heating Enhancement for Cancer Hyperthermia Therapy Based on Lithographically Defined Micro/Nanoparticles”, Advanced Materials Technologies, vol. 1, no. 3, June 2016.
- D. Clewley, J. Whitcomb, M. Moghaddam, K. McDonald, B. Chapman and P. Bunting, “Evaluation of ALOS PALSAR data for high-resolution mapping of vegetated wetlands in alaska”, Remote Sensing, vol. 7, no. 6, pp. 7272–7297, June 2015.
- Konings, A., D. Entekhabi, M. Moghaddam, and S. Saatchi, “The effect of variable soil moisture profiles on P-band backscatter,” IEEE Trans. Geosci. Remote Sensing, vol. 52, no. 10, pp. 6315–6325, October 2014.
- Ouellette, J., J. Johnson, S. Kim, J. van Zyl, M. Spencer, M. Moghaddam, L. Tsang, and D. Entekhabi, “A simulation study of compact polarimetry for radar retrieval of soil moisture,” IEEE Trans. Geosci. Remote Sensing, vol. 52, no. 9, pp. 5966–5973, September 2014.
- Khankhoje, U., M. Burgin, and M. Moghaddam, “On the accuracy of averaging radar backscatter coefficients for bare soils using the finite element method,” IEEE Geosci. Remote Sensing Lett., vol. 11, no. 8, pp. 1345–1349, August 2014.
- Haynes, M., S. Verweij, M. Moghaddam, and P. Carson, “Self-Characterization of Commercial Ultrasound Probes in Transmission Acoustic Inverse Scattering: Transducer Model and Volume Integral Formulation,” IEEE Trans. Ultrasonics, Ferroelectrics, and Frequency Control, vol. 61, no. 3, pp. 467–480, March 2014.
- Silva, A., M. Liu, and M. Moghaddam, 2012 “Power Management Techniques for Wireless Sensor Networks and Similar Low-Power Communication Devices Based on Non-Rechargeable Batteries,” J. Computer Networks and Communications. doi:10.1155/2012/757291
- Tabatabaeenejad, A., and M. Moghaddam, “Retrieval of surface and deep soil moisture and effect of moisture profile on inversion accuracy,” IEEE Geosci. Remote Sensing Lett., vol. 8, no. 3, pp. 477– 481, May 2011.
- Haynes, M., and M. Moghaddam, “Multipole and S-parameter based antenna model,” IEEE Trans. Antennas Propagat., vol. 59, no. 1, pp. 225–235, January 2011.
- Tabatabaeenejad, A., and M. Moghaddam, “Inversion of dielectric properties of layered rough surface using the simulated annealing method,” IEEE Trans. Geosci. Remote Sensing, vol. 47, no. 7, pp. 2035–2046, July 2009.
- Whitcomb, J., M. Moghaddam, K. McDonald, J. Kellndorfer, and E. Podest, “Mapping wetlands of Alaska from L-band SAR imagery,” C. J. Remote Sensing, vol. 35, no. 1, pp. 54–72, February 2009. (Winner of Best Journal Paper Award for 2009)
- Moghaddam, M., E. Yannakakis, W. C. Chew, and C. Randall, “Modeling of the subsurface interface radar,” J. Electromagn. Waves Appl. vol. 5, no. 1, pp. 17–39, 1991.
- Moghaddam, M., W. C. Chew, B. Anderson, E. Yannakakis, and Q. H. Liu, “Computation of transient electromagnetic waves in inhomogeneous media,” Rad. Sci., vol. 26. no. 1, pp. 265–273, 1991.
