= Kamal Sarabandi =

American scientist and academic

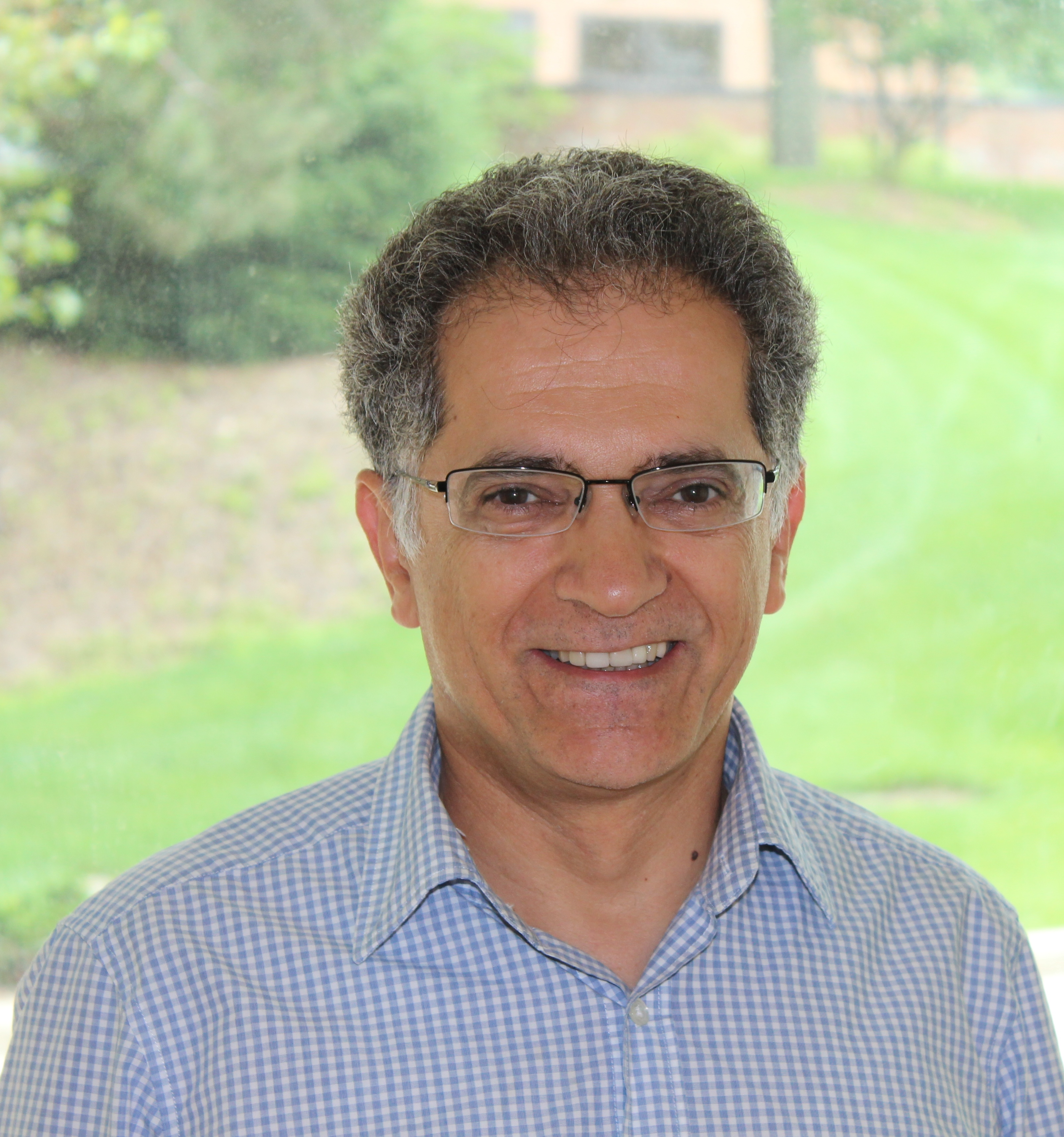
- Education: University of Michigan (Ph.D.); Sharif University of Technology (B.S.)
- Awards: Life Fellow of IEEE (2000); IEEE GRSS Distinguished Achievement Award (2005); Humboldt Research Award (2008); IEEE Judith A. Resnik Award (2011); NASA Group Achievement Award (2017); Member of the National Academy of Engineering (2021); IEEE Electromagnetics Award (2024); Ellis Island Medal of Honor (2024)
- Scientific career
- Fields: Applied Electromagnetics; Radar Remote Sensing; Antennas; Metamaterials; Automotive Radars; Wireless Communications
- Workplaces: Michigan
- Thesis: Electromagnetic scattering from vegetation canopies (1989)
- Doctoral advisor: Fawwaz T. Ulaby; Thomas B. A. Senior
- Website: web.eecs.umich.edu/faculty/sarabandi

Kamal Sarabandi (Persian: کمال سرابندی) is the Fawwaz T. Ulaby Distinguished University Professor of EECS and the Rufus S. Teesdale endowed Professor of Engineering at the University of Michigan, where he teaches and conducts research on the science and technology of microwave and millimeter wave radar remote sensing, wireless technology, electromagnetic wave propagation and scattering, metamaterials, antenna miniaturization, and nano antennas.

== Education ==
Sarabandi received the B.S. degree in electrical engineering from Sharif University of Technology, Tehran, Iran, in 1980, a M.S. degree in electrical engineering in 1986, and a M.S. degrees in applied mathematics and a Ph.D. degree in electrical engineering from the University of Michigan in 1989. His dissertation, Electromagnetic scattering from vegetation canopies, was supervised by Fawwaz T. Ulaby and Thomas B. A. Senior.

== Career and service ==
Sarabandi has career as an educator and entrepreneur, focusing on the field of applied electromagnetic and microwave remote sensing. He is known for his contributions to the science and technology of radar remote sensing for imaging the Earth's surface. His work on design of polarimetric radars, development of sophisticated electromagnetic scattering models for natural targets and their inverse solutions for monitoring vegetation, soil moisture, and snow has had implications today for better understanding of processes that lead to global warming. He was the first to establish the connections between the incoherent and coherent domains of radar polarimetry. Sarabandi served as Director of the Michigan Radiation Laboratory in the Department of Electrical Engineering and Computer Science at the University of Michigan (2000-2021). The Radiation Laboratory in its current form was established in 1952 and has played a significant role in the development and advancement of the field of Applied Electromagnetic for more than six decades. He is a prolific and world renown researcher who has published more than a 1000 impactful refereed journal and conference papers with high citation numbers and 34 best paper awards. Sarabandi served as a member of NASA Advisory Council appointed by NASA Administrator for two consecutive terms from 2006 to 2010.

Sarabandi served as president of the IEEE Geoscience and Remote Sensing Society (GRSS) in 2015 and 2016. He was a member of the editorial board of the PROCEEDINGS of the IEEE and an associate editor for the IEEE TRANSACTIONS ON ANTENNAS AND PROPAGATION and the IEEE Sensors Journal. He is a member of Commissions F and B of URSI and served as the Chair of the USNC/URSI Commission F (2018-2021). He is also a co-founder of EMAG Technologies, a high-tech company, in Ann Arbor, Michigan.

Sarabandi is a member of the Science Team for NASA Soil Moisture Active and Passive (SMAP). This is an orbiting observatory (a polar orbit around Earth) that measures the amount of water in the top 5 cm (2.0 in) of soil everywhere on Earth's surface.

== Awards ==
Sarabandi has received numerous awards in recognition for his scholarly activities; some of which are list below:

- Elected Honorary Life Member of the IEEE Geoscience Science and Remote Sensing Society AdCom, ,
- The 2025 IEEE Dennis J. Picard Medal for Radar Technologies and Applications, for outstanding accomplishments in advancing the fields of radar technologies and their applications,
- Ellis Island Medal of Honor, May 2024.
- IEEE Electromagnetics Award, "for contributions to electromagnetic sensing technology and metamaterials for antenna miniaturization." 2024.
- IEEE Antennas and Propagation Legends of Electromagnetics, 2023.
- Appointed the Fawwaz T. Ulaby Distinguished University Professor, September 2022.
- Member of the National Academy of Engineering, February 2021.
- Fellow of National Academy of Inventors (NAI), November 2019.
- Ted Kennedy Family Faculty Team Excellence Award, For Leading Center for Objective Microelectronic and Biomimetic Advance Technology, College of Engineering, The University of Michigan, March 2018.
- NASA Group Achievement Award, "For outstanding contributions to the development of the Soil Moisture Active Passive mission and demonstration of its scientific and societal impact," 15 June 2017.
- Fellow of the American Association for the Advancement of Science (AAAS), "For broad contributions to the field of applied electromagnetic, to engineering education, and to sustained economic growth," November 2016.
- The 2015-2016 Stephen S. Attwood Award from the College of Engineering. This award, which is the highest honor awarded to a faculty member by the College of Engineering, recognizes "extraordinary achievement in teaching, research, service, and other activities that have brought distinction to the College and University."
- Distinguished Alumni Award, selected as one of the top 50 Graduates of the past 50 years, Sharif University of Technology, May 2016.
- The 2013 IEEE Geoscience and Remote Sensity Society Education Award.
- The 2011 IEEE Judith A. Resnik Award with following citation: "For contribution to space-based microwave and millimeter-wave polarimetric radar remote sensing of the Earth's surface for civilian and military applications."
- The 2010 Distinguished Faculty Achievement Award from the University of Michigan.
- Appointed as the Rufus S. Teesdale Professor of Engineering.(This professorship is given in recognition of Sarabandi's sustained excellence in research, teaching, and service within the College of Engineering, January 2009.)
- Humboldt Research Award from The Alexander von Humboldt Foundation of Germany, granted to scientists and scholars from all disciplines whose fundamental discoveries, new theories, or insights have had a significant impact on their own discipline, April 2008.
- NASA Certificate of Appreciation for Significant Contribution to the Science Associated with the Lunar Exploration Architecture, Dr. Michael Griffin, NASA Administrator, and Senator Harrison H. Schmitt, Chairman of NASA Advisory Council, March 2007.
- The University of Michigan Faculty Recognition Award, "For Outstanding Contributions as a Teacher, Scholar, and Member of the University Community," October 2005.
- Distinguished Achievement Award, IEEE Geoscience and Remote Sensing Society, "For Outstanding Research in Advancement of Theoretical and Experimental Radar Remote Sensing," July 2005.
- College of Engineering Research Excellence Award, The University of Michigan, March 2004.
- Fellow of IEEE, "For contribution to modeling of radar remote sensing, and to establish the connections between the coherent and incoherent domains of radar polarimetry," January 2000.
- The 1999 German-American Council Foundation (GAAC) Distinguished Lecturer Award from the German Federal Ministry for Education, Science, and Technology.
- HP Equipment Award for establishing a microwave teaching laboratory, April 1997.
- Henry Russel Award, The Regents of The University of Michigan, January 1997 (the highest award granted at The University of Michigan).
- Teaching Excellence Award, Department of Electrical Engineering and Computer Science, The University of Michigan, March 1996.
- HP Equipment Award, June 1993.

== Publications ==
Professor Sarabandi recently authored a text book on electromagnetic for the first year graduate student:

Sarabandi, K., 2022 "Foundations of Applied Electromagnetics," The University of Michigan Press, Ann Arbor, USA. ISBN 978-1-60785-819-5.

This book is offered for free to all students and researchers worldwide and can be downloaded from: https://services.publishing.umich.edu/publications/ee/#foundations-applied-electromagnetics

Professor Sarabandi has also published more than 1000 refereed journal and conference papers.:

- Journals
- Papers
- Google Scholar
