= Tatsuo Itoh =

Japanese engineer (1940–2021)

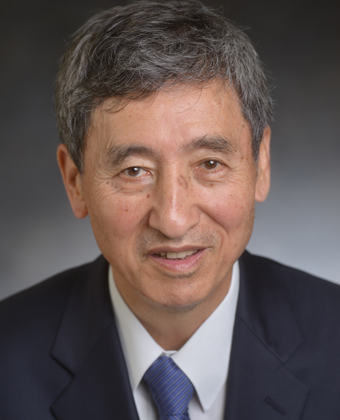
- Itoh in 2013
- Born: 5 May 1940; Tokyo, Japan
- Died: 4 March 2021
- Citizenship: Japan, United States
- Education: Yokohama National University; University of Illinois at Urbana-Champaign
- Known for: Microwave and millimeter-wave circuits
- Awards: Nikola Tesla Award (2001); IEEE Third Millennium Medal
- Scientific career
- Fields: Electrical engineering
- Thesis: Sub-Optical Resonators With Grating Mirrors (1969)
- Doctoral advisor: Eikichi Yamashita; Raj Mittra

Tatsuo Itoh (5 May 1940 — 4 March 2021), was an electrical engineer who was professor and holder of the Northrop Grumman Chair in Microwave and Millimeter Wave Electronics in the Electrical Engineering Department at the University of California, Los Angeles (UCLA), where he taught and conducted research on microwave and millimeter wave electronics, guided wave structures, low power wireless electronics, and integrated passive components and antennas.

Itoh was born on 5 May 1940 in Tokyo. He received the Bachelor of Science and Master of Science degrees in Electrical Engineering from Yokohama National University in 1964 and 1966, respectively. He received the Doctor of Philosophy degree in Electrical Engineering from the University of Illinois at Urbana–Champaign in 1969.

Itoh served as Editor-in-Chief of the IEEE Transactions on Microwave Theory and Techniques (1983–1985), and of the IEEE Microwave and Guided Wave Letters (1991–1994). He served as President of the IEEE Microwave Theory and Techniques Society in 1990. He has received a number of awards, including the 1998 Shida Award from the Japanese Ministry of Post and Telecommunications and the 1998 Japan Microwave Prize.

Itoh died on 4 March 2021.

== Awards and honors ==
- Japan Microwave Prize (1998)
- Shida Rinzaburo Award from the Japan Ministry of Post & Telecommunications (1998)
- Distinguished Alumnus Award, Electrical and Computer Engineering Department, University of Illinois at Urbana–Champaign (1999)
- IEEE Third Millennium Medal (2000)
- IEEE Distinguished Microwave Educator Award (2000)
- Nikola Tesla Award (2001)
- Member of National Academy of Engineering (2003)
- IEEE Distinguished Microwave Lecturer (2004–06)
- Fellow of the National Academy of Inventors (2014)
- IEEE Electromagnetics Award (2018)

== Books ==
- T. Itoh, editor, Planar Transmission Line Structures IEEE Press, NY, 1987.
- T. Itoh, editor, Numerical Techniques for Microwave and Millimeter-wave Passive Structures Wiley, NY, 1989.
- T. Itoh, G. Pelosi, and P. P. Silvester, editors, Finite Element Software for Microwave Engineering, Wiley, NY, 1996.
- T. Itoh and B. Houshmand, Time-Domain Methods for Microwave Structures: Analysis and Design, Wiley NY, 1998 1998
- T. Itoh, G. Haddad, and J. Harvey, editors, RF Technologies for Low Power Wireless Communications Wiley Inter-Science, 2001.
- C. Caloz and T. Itoh, Electromagnetic Metamaterials, Wiley-IEEE Press, 2005.

== Patent(s) ==
Link to USPTO search for patents having inventor names "itoh" and "tatsuo" and an assignee name including the string "regent"

== See also ==
- List of textbooks in electromagnetism
