= Archie W. Straiton =

- Born: 27 August 1907; Arlington, Texas
- Died: 22 July 2000 (aged 92)
- Education: University of Texas at Austin
- Awards: IEEE Edison Medal (1990)
- Scientific career
- Doctoral students: Fawwaz T. Ulaby

Archie Waugh Straiton (27 August 1907 – 22 July 2000) was a physicist, who studied radio propagation.

== Biography ==
He received the degrees of B.S. in E.E., M.A. in Physics, and the Ph.D. in Physics from The University of Texas at Austin in 1929, 1931, and 1939, respectively.

From 1931 to 1943, he taught at Texas A&M University at Kingsville, and in 1943 he joined his alma mater, the University of Texas at Austin, where he served as Chairman of the Electrical Engineering Department from 1966 to 1971 and as Acting Dean of the Graduate School and Vice-President from 1972 to 1973. He retired in 1989.

He was a Fellow of the IEEE and a member of the National Academy of Engineering. He was awarded the IEEE Edison Medal in 1990 "For an outstanding career in electrical engineering with significant contributions in the fields of radio propagation and astronomy, and in engineering education."
