= Raj Mittra =

Indian electrical engineer and academic

- Born: July 1, 1932 (age 94); India
- Education: Agra College; University of Calcutta; University of Toronto
- Awards: IEEE Centennial Medal; IEEE Electromagnetics Award; IEEE James H. Mulligan Jr. Education Medal; USNC-URSI Distinguished Radio Science Award
- Scientific career
- Fields: Electrical engineering; Applied and computational electromagnetics
- Workplaces: University of Illinois at Urbana–Champaign; Pennsylvania State University; University of Central Florida
- Thesis: Solution of Boundary Value Problems in Nonuniform and Inhomogeneously-filled Waveguides (1957)
- Doctoral students: Tatsuo Itoh; Yahya Rahmat-Samii; Donald R. Wilton; Stephen Gedney

Raj Mittra (born 1 July 1932) is an Indian-born electrical engineer and academic. He is currently a professor of electrical engineering at University of Central Florida. Previously, he was a faculty member at University of Illinois at Urbana–Champaign and Pennsylvania State University, where he was the director of the Electromagnetic Communication Laboratory of the Electrical Engineering department. His specialities include computational electromagnetics and communication antenna design.

== Biography ==
Mittra was born on the 1st July 1932, in India. In 1950, he graduated from Agra College, Uttar Pradesh, with a Bachelor of Science in physics, followed by a Master of Science in radio physics received in 1953 from the University of Calcutta in Kolkata, India and a Ph.D. in electrical engineering in 1957 from the University of Toronto in Canada.

== Professional career ==
In 1957, Mittra became a visiting assistant professor in the Electrical and Computer Engineering Department at the University of Illinois in Urbana, Illinois. In 1961 he was promoted to associate professor, and in 1966 to full professor. At this time he also became the associate director of the Electromagnetics Laboratory. In 1984, he was named the director of its Electromagnetic Communication Laboratory, and continued to work at the University of Illinois until he retired in 1996.

After a short retirement, later in 1996 Mittra took a professor position at Penn State in the Electrical Engineering Department. He founded and was appointed as the director of its Electromagnetic Communication Laboratory. He still holds these positions in 2013. In 2015, he moved to Orlando, Florida and became a professor at University of Central Florida.

He served a one-year term as president of the IEEE Antennas and Propagation Society (AP-S) from 1976 to 1977. He became president of RM Associates, a consulting firm, in 1980 and remains so in 2013. He was elected to the board of directors of the Electromagnetics Society in 1978. He was the editor for the Transactions Antennas and Propagation Society from 1980 to 1983 and International Journal of Electronics and Communications from 1975 to 2001.

== Research and publications ==
Mittra's research interests include communication antenna design, computational electromagnetics, electromagnetic modeling and simulation of electronic packages, electromagnetic compatibility (EMC) analysis, and radio scattering.

=== Books authored or co-authored ===
- R. Mittra, and S. W. Lee, Analytical Techniques in the Theory of Guided Waves, McMillan and Company, 1971.
- D. Bouche, F. Molinet, and R. Mittra, Asymptotic Methods in Electromagnetics, Springer-Verlag, 1997.
- A. F. Peterson, S. L. Ray, and R. Mittra, Computational Methods for Electromagnetics, The IEEE/OUP Series on Electromagnetic Wave Theory and Oxford University Press, 1997.
- Wenhua Yu and Raj Mittra, CFDTD: Conformal Finite-Difference Time-Domain Maxwell's Equations Solver, Software and User's Guide, Artech House Publisher, 2004.
- Yinchao Chen, Qunsheng Cao, Raj Mittra, Multiresolution Time Domain Scheme for Electromagnetic Engineering, A John Wiley & Sons, Inc., Publication, January 2005.
- Wenhua Yu, Raj Mittra, Tao Su, Yongjun Liu and Xiaoling Yang, Parallel Finite-Difference Time-Domain Method," Artech House Publisher, July 2006.

=== Books edited or co-edited ===
- R. Mittra, Numerical and Asymptotic Techniques for Electromagnetics, Springer-Verlag, 1975.
- R. Mittra, and H. L. Maanders, "Spectral theory of diffraction," Modern Topics in Electromagnetics and Antennas, Peter Peregrines Ltd., New York, 1977.
- R. Mittra, W. A. Imbriale, and E. J. Maanders, Satellite Communication Antenna Technology, North-Holland, 1983.
- R. Mittra, Computer Techniques for Electromagnetics, Pergamon Press, 1973. Revised, Hemisphere Publishing Corporation, 1987.
- A. Guran, R. Mittra, and P. J Moser, Eds., Electromagnetic Wave Interactions With a foreword by Hans A. Bethe, World Scientific, New Jersey, 1996.
- Douglas H. Werner and Raj Mittra, Frontiers in Electromagnetics, IEEE Press, 1999.

== Awards ==
He has received the following awards:

- IEEE James H. Mulligan, Jr. Education Medal – 2011
- IEEE Electromagnetics Award – 2006
- AP-S Chen-To Tai Distinguished Educator Award – 2004
- IEEE/AP-S Distinguished Achievement Award – 2002
- IEEE Millennium medal – 2000
- IEEE Centennial Medal – 1984
