= Yahya Rahmat-Samii =

American engineer and academic (born 1948)

- Born: August 20, 1948 (age 78); Tehran, Iran
- Citizenship: Iran, United States
- Education: University of Illinois at Urbana-Champaign; University of Tehran
- Awards: Member of the National Academy of Engineering (2008)
- Scientific career
- Fields: Electrical engineering
- Workplaces: University of California, Los Angeles
- Thesis: A new integral equation solution of electromagnetic aperture coupling and thin plate scattering problems (1975)
- Doctoral advisor: Raj Mittra

Yahya Rahmat-Samii (Persian: یحیی رحمت-سمیعی; born August 20, 1948) is the Northrop Grumman Chair Professor in Electromagnetics at the electrical engineering department at the University of California, Los Angeles, where he teaches and conducts research on microwave transmission and radio antennas. Rahmat-Samii received his Bachelor of Science degree in electrical engineering in 1970 from the University of Tehran, Iran, and the Master of Science in 1972 and the Doctor of Philosophy degrees in electrical engineering in 1975 from the University of Illinois at Urbana-Champaign. Before joining UCLA in 1989, he was a senior research scientist at the NASA Jet Propulsion Laboratory.

He has made innovations in satellite communications antennas, personal communication antennas, wearable and implanted antennas for communications and biotelemetry, and antennas for remote sensing and radio astronomy applications. He is the director of the UCLA Antenna Research, Analysis and Measurement Laboratory.

== Awards and honors ==
- IEEE Electromagnetics Award (2011)
- Member of the National Academy of Engineering (2008)
- Chen-To Tai Distinguished Educator Award of the IEEE Antennas & Propagation Society (2007)
- International Union of Radio Science Booker Gold Medal (2005)
- Foreign Member of The Royal Academies for Science and the Arts of Belgium (2001)
- Honoris Causa Doctorate, Universidade de Santiago de Compostela, Spain (2001)
- IEEE Third Millennium Medal (2000)
- Distinguished Alumnus Award, Electrical and Computer Engineering Department, University of Illinois at Urbana-Champaign (1999)

== Books ==
- 2008: (with F. Yang) Electromagnetic Band Gap Structures in Antenna Engineering, Cambridge University Press.
- 2006: (with J. Kim) Implanted Antennas in Medical Wireless Communications, Morgan and Claypool Publishers.
- 1999: (with E. Michielssen as editors) Electromagnetic Optimization by Genetic Algorithms, Wiley, NY.
- 1995: (with D. Hoppe) Impedance Boundary Conditions in Electromagnetics, Taylor & Francis, Washington, DC.

== See also ==
- List of members of the National Academy of Engineering (Electronics)
