= Peter P. Silvester =

Peter Peet Silvester
- Born: January 25, 1935; Tallinn, Estonia
- Died: October 11, 1996 (aged 61); Victoria, British Columbia, Canada
- Known for: Computational electromagnetics Finite element method
- Scientific career
- Fields: Computational electromagnetics Finite element method
- Workplaces: McGill University (Montreal)

Peter Peet Silvester (January 25, 1935 – October 11, 1996), was an electrical engineer who contributed to understanding of numerical analysis of electromagnetic fields and authored a standard textbook on the subject.

Silvester was born in Tallinn, Estonia. He graduated from the Camegie Institute of Technology (now Carnegie-Mellon University) in Pittsburgh, Pennsylvania, in 1956. After a period of industrial practice, he continued his studies at the University of Toronto, obtaining the MASc in 1958, and then at McGill University (Montreal), where he was awarded the PhD in electrical engineering, in 1964. He initially joined the department of electrical engineering at McGill as lecturer, then as assistant professor, associate professor, and full professor. In 1996, he was honored with the titles of emeritus professor at McGill University, and honorary professor at the University of British Columbia.

Silvester devoted a large part of his career to the numerical analysis of electromagnetic field], with applications to magnetics, microwaves, geomagnetics, antennas, and bioelectricity. His main research focused on the finite element method, as applied to electromagnetics, where he was a pioneer. His paper, Finite-Element Solution of Homogeneous-Waveguide Problems, presented at the 1968 URSI Symposium on Electromagnetic Waves, and later on, published in the Italian technical journal, Alta Frequenza, was definitely the first FEM application to electronic engineering.

In this field, his contributions were valuable, both from the theoretical and the applications side. He studied topics which ranged from potential and scalar-wave problems, in the first years, to applications to microwave devices, antennas, electric machines, as well as new kinds of elements and formulations, open-boundary problems, and parallel computing. His book, Finite Elements for Electrical Engineering, written with Ron Ferrari, has been the only textbook on this specific topic for many years, and it has been translated into many languages, among which are Russian, Chinese, Japanese, and Spanish.

He founded the Computational Analysis and Design Laboratory (CAD-Lab) at the Electrical Engineering Department of McGill University, in 1978, which has now become probably the largest research organization of its kind in Canada, and one of the largest in the world. Peter Silvester also was a founder of Infolytica Corporation (Montreal), a consulting and engineering simulation software (computer-aided engineering, or CAE) company.

Silvester maintained strong research ties with colleagues of several other institutions, notably the University of Cambridge and the University of Florence, creatively sharing his knowledge. He also acted as a consultant to a number of major corporations and government agencies.

He was a member of major professional organizations in his field, a member of steering committees and boards of various scientific and professional conferences, and was elected a Fellow of the IEEE for "...contributions to the art of finite-element analysis." He was also a Fellow of the IEE, and of the Royal Society of Canada. His archives are held at the McGill University Archives.

== Books ==
- Peter P. Silvester, M. V. K. Chari, Finite Elements in Electrical and Magnetic Field Problems, John Wiley & Sons Inc, 1980. ISBN 0-471-27578-6
- Peter P. Silvester, Ronald L. Ferrari, Finite Elements for Electrical Engineers, 1ed, Cambridge University Press, 1983.
- Peter P. Silvester, D. A. Lowther Computer-Aided Design in Magnetics, Berlin, Springer-Verlag, 1986
- Peter P. Silvester, Ronald L. Ferrari, Finite Elements for Electrical Engineers, 2ed, Cambridge University Press, 1990.
- Peter P. Silvester, Giuseppe Pelosi, Finite Elements for Wave Electromagnetics, IEEE Press, New York, 1994, ISBN 0-7803-1040-3
- Peter P. Silvester, Tatsuo Itoh, Giuseppe Pelosi, Finite Element Software for Microwave Engineering, Wiley-Interscience, 1996, ISBN 0-471-12636-5
- Peter P. Silvester, Institution of Electrical Engineers (Corporate Author), University of Florence (Corporate Author), Software for Electrical Engineering Analysis and Design III, Computational Mechanics, 1996, ISBN 1-85312-395-1
- Peter P. Silvester, Ronald L. Ferrari, Finite Elements for Electrical Engineers, 3ed, Cambridge University Press, 1996.

== See also ==
- List of textbooks in electromagnetism
