= Jin Au Kong =

American expert in applied electromagnetics

- 孔金甌
- Born: December 27, 1942; Gaochun, Jiangsu, Republic of China
- Died: March 13, 2008 (aged 65)
- Education: National Taiwan University (BS); National Chiao Tung University (MS); Syracuse University (PhD)
- Scientific career
- Fields: Electrical engineering; Electromagnetism
- Workplaces: Massachusetts Institute of Technology; Zhejiang University
- Thesis: Wave Propagation in Moving Anisotropic Media (1968)
- Doctoral advisor: David K. Cheng
- Doctoral students: Weng Cho Chew; Shun Lien Chuang; Leung Tsang
- Website: www.emacademy.org/JAKONG

Jin Au Kong (Traditional Chinese: 孔金甌; Simplified Chinese: 孔金瓯; 27 December 1942 – 13 March 2008) was a Taiwanese-American electrical engineer. He was an expert in applied electromagnetics. He was a 74th-generation lineal descendant of the famous Chinese philosopher Confucius (551 BC – 479 BC).

== Biography ==
Kong was born in Gaochun, Jiangsu Province. He received his Bachelor of Science from the National Taiwan University in 1962, his M.S. from the National Chiao Tung University in 1965, and his Ph.D. from Syracuse University in 1968. His PhD thesis supervisor was David K. Cheng. Kong did his postdoctoral research at Syracuse University as well from 1968 to 1969. From 1969 to 1971, he was the Vinton Hayes Postdoctoral Fellow of Engineering.

Kong then moved to MIT, where he remained for the rest of his academic career, as assistant professor from 1969 to 1973, associate professor from 1973 to 1980, and promoted to full professor in 1980. From 1977 until his death in 2008, Kong served as a United Nations high-level consultant to the undersecretary-general, as well as an interregional advisor on remote sensing technology for the United Nations Department of Technical Cooperation for Development. At MIT and later Zhejiang University, Kong supervised about 50 PhD theses and 90 Master theses. From 1984 to 2003, he was the chairman of Area IV on Energy and Electromagnetic Systems at MIT. From 1989 until 2008, Kong was director of the Center for Electromagnetic Theory and Applications in the Research Laboratory of Electronics at MIT.

Kong was the founding president of The Electromagnetics Academy from 1989 to 2008. He also founded the academy's China branch at Zhejiang University in Hangzhou, known as The Electromagnetics Academy at Zhejiang University, serving as its dean from 2003 to 2008.

Kong was also the founding chair of the Progress In Electromagnetics Research Symposium (PIERS), from 1989 to 2008. From 1987 to 2008, he was the editor-in-chief of the Journal of Electromagnetic Waves and Applications. He was the founding chief editor for Progress in Electromagnetics Research's (PIER) series (1989–2008), chief editor for Progress In Electromagnetics Research (PIER) Letters, B, M, C in 2008, and chief editor for PIERS Online from 2005 to 2008.

== Honors and awards ==
Kong was rewarded with many honors and awards during his life, including:

- Fellow, The Electromagnetics Academy
- Fellow, Institute of Electrical and Electronics Engineers
- Fellow, Optical Society of America
- Distinguished Achievement Award, from the IEEE Geoscience and Remote Sensing Society, 2000
- IEEE Electromagnetics Award, 2004
- Honorary doctorate from Paris X University Nanterre, 2006

== Books ==
- Electromagnetic Wave Theory, J. A. Kong, EMW Publishing, 1016 pg, 2008 (Previous editions by Wiley-Interscience: 1975, 1986 and 1990 and EMW Publishing: 1998, 2000 and 2005)
- Maxwell Equations, J. A. Kong, EMW Publishing, 398 pg, 2002
- Theory of Microwave Remote Sensing, L. Tsang, J. A. Kong and R.T. Shin, Wiley-Interscience, 613 pages, 1985
- Scattering of Electromagnetic Waves: Theories and Applications, L. Tsang, J. A. Kong and K. H. Ding, Wiley-Interscience, 426 pg, 2000
- Scattering of Electromagnetic Waves: Numerical Simulations, L. Tsang, J. A. Kong, K. H. Ding and C. Ao, Wiley-Interscience, 705 pg, 2001
- Scattering of Electromagnetic Waves: Advanced Topics, L. Tsang and J. A. Kong, Wiley-Interscience, 413 pg, 2001
- Applied Electromagnetism, L.C. Shen and J. A. Kong, PWS, 1987
- Electromagnetic Waves, David H. Staelin, Ann W. Morgenthaler and Jin Au Kong, 1993

== See also ==
- List of textbooks in electromagnetism
