= Arthur D. Yaghjian =

American electrical engineer

Arthur David Yaghjian
- Born: 1943 (age 82–83); Providence, Rhode Island, USA
- Education: Brown University
- Awards: IEEE Electromagnetics Award (2022)
- Scientific career
- Fields: electrical engineering; electromagnetic/antenna theory
- Workplaces: National Institute of Standards and Technology; Air Force Research Laboratory
- Thesis: Hybrid modes and the dielectric rod antenna (1969)

Arthur David Yaghjian (born January 1, 1943) is an American electrical engineer who is best known for his contributions to electromagnetic theory and its applications.

== Education and career ==
A native of Providence, Rhode Island, Yaghjian received B.S. (1964), M.S.(1966) and Ph.D.(1969) degrees in electrical engineering from Brown University. After working as an instructor at Tougaloo College and Hampton University, he joined the electromagnetics division of the National Institute of Standards and Technology in 1971. In 1983, he became a research scientist at the electromagnetics directorate of the Air Force Research Laboratory, where he worked until 1996. He held guest professorships at IIT Kharagpur (1987), Technical University of Denmark (1989) and University of Siena (2007).

Yaghjian's contributions include probe-compensated near-field antenna measurements, theory of electromagnetic fields in metamaterials, dyadic Green's functions and analysis of electrically small antennas.

== Honors ==
Yaghjian is a Life Fellow of the IEEE. In 2020, he was awarded an honorary doctorate from the Technical University of Denmark. Yaghjian received the 2021 IEEE APS Distinguished Achievement Award. In 2022, he received the IEEE Electromagnetics Award "for contributions to fundamental electromagnetic theory and its applications to near-field antenna measurements."

== Selected publications ==
Journal articles

- Yaghjian, A.D. (1980). "Electric dyadic Green's functions in the source region". Proceedings of the IEEE. 68 (2): 248–263, 1980. doi:10.1109/PROC.1980.11620.
- Yaghjian, A.D. (1982). "Efficient computation of antenna coupling and fields within the near-field region". IEEE Transactions on Antennas and Propagation. 30 (1): 113–128, 1982. Bibcode:1982ITAP...30..113Y. doi:10.1109/TAP.1982.1142752.
- Yaghjian, A.D. (1984). "Approximate formulas for the far field and gain of open-ended rectangular waveguide". IEEE Transactions on Antennas and Propagation. 32 (4): 378–384, 1984. Bibcode:1984ITAP...32..378Y. doi:10.1109/TAP.1984.1143332.
- Yaghjian, A.D.; Wittmann, R.C. (1985). "Efficient computation of antenna coupling and fields within the near-field region". IEEE Transactions on Antennas and Propagation. 33 (11): 1175–1185, 1985. doi:10.1109/TAP.1985.1143520.
- Yaghjian, A.D. (1986). "An overview of near-field antenna measurements". IEEE Transactions on Antennas and Propagation. 34 (1): 30–45, 1986. Bibcode:1986ITAP...34...30Y. doi:10.1109/TAP.1986.1143727.
- Shore, R.A.; Yaghjian, A.D. (1988). "Incremental diffraction coefficients for planar surfaces". IEEE Transactions on Antennas and Propagation. 36 (1): 55–70, 1988. Bibcode:1988ITAP...36...55S. doi:10.1109/8.1075.
- Hansen, T.B.; Yaghjian, A.D. (1994). "Planar near-field scanning in the time domain .1. Formulation". IEEE Transactions on Antennas and Propagation. 42 (9): 1280–1291, 1994. Bibcode:1994ITAP...42.1280H. doi:10.1109/8.318649.
- Yaghjian, A.D.; Best, S.R. (2005). "Impedance, bandwidth, and Q of antennas". IEEE Transactions on Antennas and Propagation. 53 (4): 1298–1324, 2005. Bibcode:2005ITAP...53.1298Y. doi:10.1109/TAP.2005.844443.
- Shore, R.A.; Yaghjian, A.D. (2007). "Traveling waves on two- and three-dimensional periodic arrays of lossless scatterers". Radio Science. 42 (6): RS6S21(1-40), 2007. Bibcode:2007RaSc...42.6S21S. doi:10.1029/2007RS003647.
- Yaghjian, A.D.; Maci, S. (2008). "Alternative derivation of electromagnetic cloaks and concentrators". New Journal of Physics. 10 (11): 115022, 2008. arXiv:0710.2933. Bibcode:2008NJPh...10k5022Y. doi:10.1088/1367-2630/10/11/115022.
- Yaghjian, A.D.; O'Donnell, T.H.; Altshuler, E.E.; Best, S.R. (2008). "Electrically small supergain end-fire arrays". Radio Science. 43 (3): 1–13, 2008. arXiv:0708.1988. Bibcode:2008RaSc...43.3002Y. doi:10.1029/2007RS003747.
- Yaghjian, A.D.; Gustafsson, M.; Jonsson, B.L.G. (2013). "Minimum Q for lossy and lossless electrically small dipole antennas". Progress in Electromagnetics Research. 143 (10): 641–673, 2013. doi:10.2528/PIER13103107.
- Yaghjian, A.D. (2014). "Reflections on Maxwells Treatise". Progress in Electromagnetics Research. 149: 217–249, 2014. doi:10.2528/PIER14092503.
- Yaghjian, A.D. (2018). "Overcoming the Chu lower bound on antenna Q with highly dispersive lossy material". IET Microwaves, Antennas & Propagation. 12 (4): 459–466, 2018. doi:10.1049/iet-map.2017.0648.
- Yaghjian, A.D. (2020). "Stellar speckle and correlation derived from classical wave expansions for spherical antennas". IEEE Transactions on Antennas and Propagation. 68 (11): 7423–7438, 2020. arXiv:1910.08113. Bibcode:2020ITAP...68.7423Y. doi:10.1109/TAP.2020.2997995.
- Yaghjian, A.D. (2023). "Electromagnetic force and momentum in classical macroscopic dipolar media". Progress in Electromagnetics Research B. 103: 119–138, 2023. arXiv:2210.12267. doi:10.2528/PIERB23071801.

Books

- Yaghjian, Arthur D. (2022). Relativistic Dynamics of a Charged Sphere: Updating the Lorentz-Abraham Model (3 ed.). Springer-Verlag Berlin Heidelberg. ISBN 978-3-031-06066-3.
- Hansen, Thorkild B.; Yaghjian, Arthur D. (1999). Plane-Wave Theory of Time-Domain Fields: Near-Field Scanning Applications. John Wiley & Sons. ISBN 9780780334281.

Patents

- Apparatus for scanning and measuring the near-field radiation of an antenna (US4704614A)
- Electrically small supergain endfire array antenna (US8134516B1)
