= Donald R. Wilton =

American electrical engineer and academic

Donald Robert Wilton
- Born: October 25, 1942 (age 84); Lawton, Oklahoma, U.S.
- Education: University of Illinois Urbana-Champaign
- Known for: Rao–Wilton–Glisson basis function
- Awards: IEEE Electromagnetics Award (2015); National Academy of Engineering membership (2021)
- Scientific career
- Fields: Electrical engineering; Computational electromagnetics
- Workplaces: Hughes Aircraft Company; University of Mississippi; University of Houston
- Thesis: A new numerical approach to the calculation of electromagnetic scattering properties of two-dimensional bodies of arbitrary cross-section (1970)
- Doctoral advisor: Raj Mittra
- Website: www.ece.uh.edu/faculty/wilton

Donald Robert Wilton (born October 25, 1942) is an American electrical engineer who is a professor emeritus at Department of Electrical and Computer Engineering at University of Houston. He is best known for his contributions to the field of computational electromagnetics.

== Biography ==
Donald Robert Wilton was born on October 25, 1942 in Lawton, Oklahoma. He received B.S., M.S., and Ph.D. degrees in electrical engineering from the University of Illinois Urbana-Champaign, in 1964, 1966, and 1970, respectively. From 1965 to 1968, he was affiliated with Hughes Aircraft Company, where he worked on phased arrays. He joined the Department of Electrical Engineering at University of Mississippi in 1970. He was a visiting professor at Syracuse University from 1978 to 1979. From 1983 until his retirement in 2012, he has been with University of Houston, where he is a professor of electrical engineering. Wilton is best known for his work in computational electromagnetics: he has introduced the namesake Rao–Wilton–Glisson (RWG) triangular surface basis functions, widely used in method of moments modeling of complex structures, with his doctoral students Sadasiva M. Rao and Allen W. Glisson.

Wilton is a member of Commission B of International Union of Radio Science and is a fellow of the IEEE. In 2015, he received IEEE Electromagnetics Award "for fundamental contributions to integral equation methods in computational electromagnetics." In 2021, He was elected to the National Academy of Engineering for "contributions to computational electromagnetics of highly complex structures."

== Selected publications ==
Journal articles

- Glisson, A.; Wilton, D. (September 1980). "Simple and efficient numerical methods for problems of electromagnetic radiation and scattering from surfaces". IEEE Transactions on Antennas and Propagation. 28 (5): 593–603. Bibcode:1980ITAP...28..593G. doi:10.1109/TAP.1980.1142390.
- Rao, S.; Wilton, D.; Glisson, A. (May 1982). "Electromagnetic scattering by surfaces of arbitrary shape". IEEE Transactions on Antennas and Propagation. 30 (3): 409–418. Bibcode:1982ITAP...30..409R. doi:10.1109/TAP.1982.1142818.
- Schaubert, D.; Wilton, D.; Glisson, A. (January 1984). "A tetrahedral modeling method for electromagnetic scattering by arbitrarily shaped inhomogeneous dielectric bodies". IEEE Transactions on Antennas and Propagation. 32 (1): 77–85. Bibcode:1984ITAP...32...77S. doi:10.1109/TAP.1984.1143193.
- Wilton, D.; Rao, S.; Glisson, A.; Schaubert, D.; Al-Bundak, O.; Butler, C. (March 1984). "Potential integrals for uniform and linear source distributions on polygonal and polyhedral domains". IEEE Transactions on Antennas and Propagation. 32 (3): 276–281. Bibcode:1984ITAP...32..276W. doi:10.1109/TAP.1984.1143304.
- Rao, S.M.; Wilton, D.R. (January 1991). "Transient scattering by conducting surfaces of arbitrary shape". IEEE Transactions on Antennas and Propagation. 39 (1): 56–61. Bibcode:1991ITAP...39...56R. doi:10.1109/8.64435.
- Graglia, R. D.; Wilton, D. R.; Peterson, A. F. (March 1997). "Higher order interpolatory vector bases for computational electromagnetics". IEEE Transactions on Antennas and Propagation. 45 (3): 329–342. Bibcode:1997ITAP...45..329G. doi:10.1109/8.558649.
