= Neda Ulaby =

Jordanian American reporter for National Public Radio

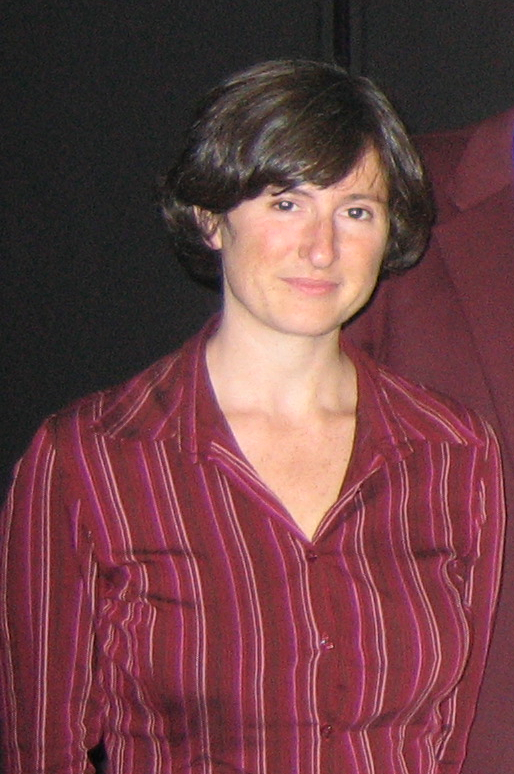
- At the Future of Music Coalition's 2005 meeting
- Born: 1970 (age 55–56); Amman, Jordan
- Occupation: Reporter for National Public Radio
- Known for: Covering arts, cultural trends and digital media

Neda Ulaby (Arabic: ندى علبي, born c. 1970) is an American reporter for National Public Radio, covering arts, cultural trends and digital media. She lives in Washington, D.C.

== Early life and education ==
Born during Black September in Amman, Jordan, Ulaby spent her childhood in Lawrence, Kansas, and Ann Arbor, Michigan. The father who raised her, Fawwaz Ulaby, is a professor of electrical engineering from Damascus, Syria.

After graduating from the alternative Community High School in Ann Arbor, she attended Bryn Mawr College, graduating in 1993. She also studied at Oxford University, England, and in 1995 graduated with an MA in English from the University of Chicago. She is a former doctoral student in English literature.

== Career ==
Ulaby began her career as an intern for the features desk of the Topeka Capital-Journal from 1993 to 1994 and later freelanced for the Chicago Reader and the Washington City Paper. Ulaby became managing editor of Chicago's Windy City Times in 1999, holding the post for one year, and later became co-host of the radio program What's Coming Out at the Movies.

She has taught classes in the humanities at the University of Chicago, Northeastern Illinois University, and at high schools serving at-risk students. She has also edited fiction for The Chicago Review and served on the editing staff of the prominent academic journal Critical Inquiry. Ulaby joined NPR in 2000 as part of their Next Generation Radio Initiative, and worked as an editorial assistant and producer before becoming a reporter in 2003.

== Notable work ==
Neda Ulaby was one of the first to report on the 2005 Sony BMG CD copy protection scandal. She has also reported investigative pieces critical of Body Worlds and BODIES...the exhibition. She is included in the anthology Bodies Out of Bounds: Fatness and Transgression.

Her film reviews have appeared in alternative papers nationwide and her articles on slapstick comedy have been published internationally.

She hosted the Emmy award-winning public television series Arab American Stories, and in 2010, won a Gracie Award from The American Women in Radio & Television. Ulaby has also been recognized with fellowships from the Knight Center for Specialized Journalism and the USC Annenberg/Getty Arts Journalism Program.

== Personal life ==
In 2014, Ulaby married political consultant Robin Brand, whom she had met online in 2003. On June 6, 2018, Ulaby tweeted "I am, officially, a gay divorcee."

== See also ==
- Sylvia Poggioli
- Bob Edwards
- Michele Norris
- Corey Flintoff
