= John L. Volakis =

American engineer, educator and writer

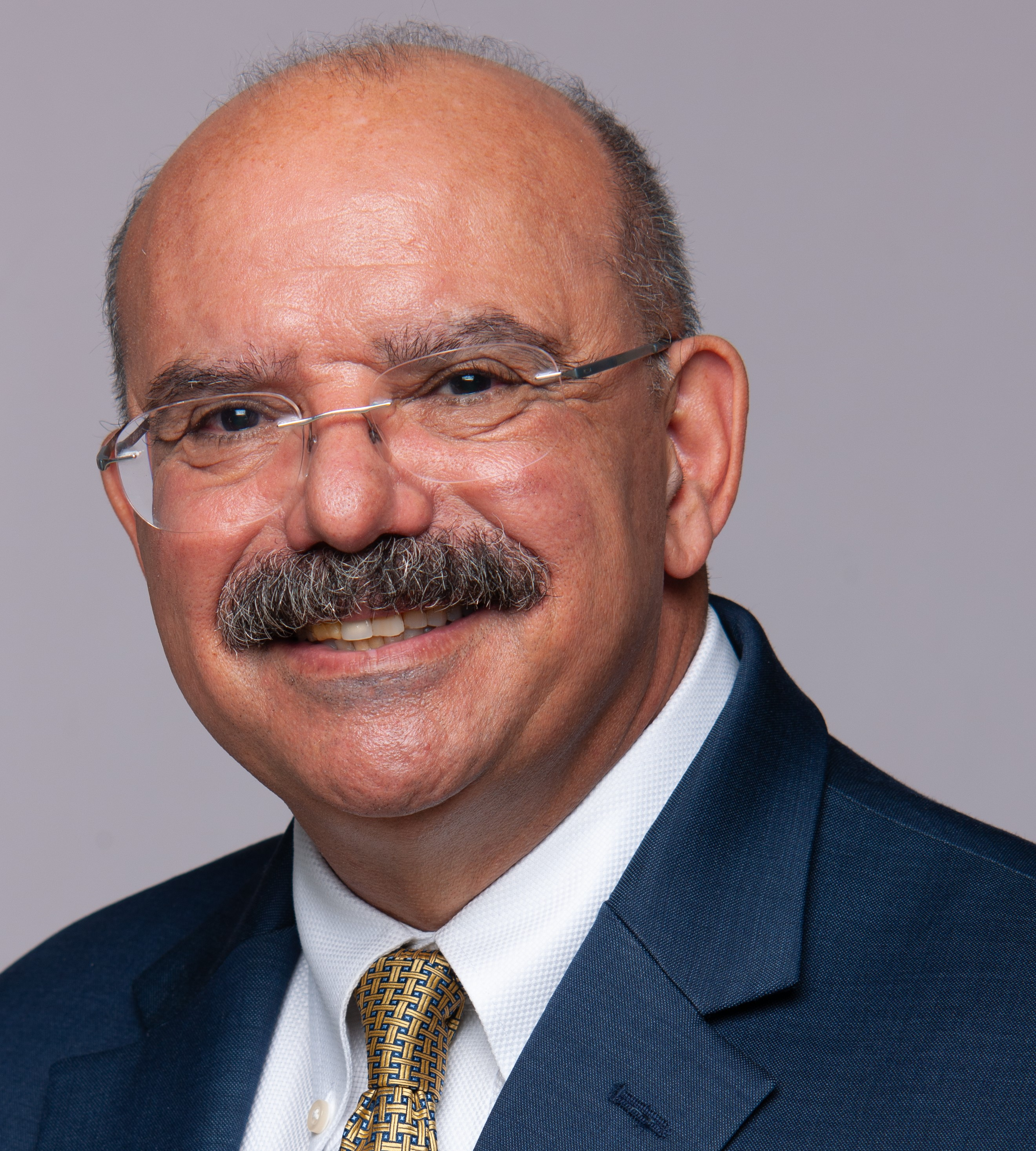
- Born: May 13, 1956; Chios, Greece
- Education: Ohio State University, Youngstown State University
- Awards: IEEE Electromagnetics Award (2026); URSI Booker Gold Medal (2020); IEEE Fellow (1996)
- Scientific career
- Fields: Electrical Engineering, Antennas, Electromagnetism, Computational electromagnetics
- Workplaces: Florida International University, Ohio State University, University of Michigan
- Thesis: Electromagnetic scattering from inlets and plates mounted on arbitrary smooth surfaces (1982)

John Leonidas Volakis (Ιωάννης Λ. Βολάκης; born May 13, 1956) is a Greek-American electrical engineer and academic specializing in computational electromagnetics, antenna design, and RF materials. He is a Fellow of the IEEE, the American Association for the Advancement of Science, and the National Academy of Inventors, and a recipient of the URSI Booker Gold Medal. He served as President of the IEEE Antennas and Propagation Society in 2004.

== Early life and education ==
Volakis was born on the island of Chios, Greece, and grew up in the village of Olympi, one of the mastic villages in the south of the island. He immigrated to the United States in 1973 and attended Warren G. Harding High School before enrolling in university.

He received his B.S. from Youngstown State University in 1978, graduating summa cum laude, and his M.Sc. (1979) and Ph.D. (1982) from Ohio State University.

== Career ==
After completing his doctorate, Volakis worked at Rockwell International's North American Aircraft Operations (1982–1984). In 1984, he joined the University of Michigan as an assistant professor of electrical engineering, becoming a full professor in 1994. He served as Director of the university's Radiation Laboratory from 1998 to 2000.

From 2003 to 2017, he held the Roy and Lois Chope Chair in Engineering at Ohio State University and directed the ElectroScience Laboratory (2003–2016).

In 2017, he was appointed Dean of the College of Engineering and Computing at Florida International University, a position he held until 2023. He remains a professor in FIU's Department of Electrical and Computer Engineering.

== Research ==
Volakis's research has focused on computational electromagnetics, antenna miniaturization, wideband conformal antennas, wearable electronics, and RF materials. His work on hybrid finite element methods for microwave engineering has been widely adopted in commercial RF design software. His group has also contributed to research on tightly coupled dipole antennas, wireless passive neural recording devices, and approximate boundary conditions for electromagnetic scattering.

== Selected publications ==
- Volakis, John Leonidas (2019). Antenna engineering handbook. Richard C. Johnson, Henry Jasik, Thomas F. Eibert, Derek M. K. Ah Yo, Rudy Emrick (Fifth ed.). New York. ISBN 978-1-259-64470-2. OCLC 1099661923.
- Volakis, John Leonidas (2012). Integral equation methods for electromagnetics. Kubilay Sertel. Raleigh, NC: SciTech Pub. ISBN 978-1-61353-112-9. OCLC 842939772.
- Volakis, John Leonidas (2010). Small antennas : miniaturization techniques & applications. Chi-Chih Chen, K. Fujimoto. New York: McGraw-Hill. ISBN 978-0-07-162553-1. OCLC 636905579.
- Volakis, John Leonidas (1998). Finite element method for electromagnetics : antennas, microwave circuits, and scattering applications. A., PhD Chatterjee, Leo C. Kempel. New York: IEEE Press. ISBN 978-0-7803-3425-0. OCLC 38055905.
- Senior, Thomas B. A. (1995). Approximate boundary conditions in electromagnetics. J. L. Volakis, Institution of Electrical Engineers. London: IET Press. ISBN 978-0-85296-849-9. OCLC 32509096.
