= Robert Plonsey =

American bioelectricity academic

- Born: July 17, 1924; New York, New York, United States
- Died: March 14, 2015 (aged 90); Chapel Hill, North Carolina, United States
- Education: Cooper Union; New York University; University of California, Berkeley
- Known for: Bioelectricity
- Scientific career
- Fields: Biomedical engineering
- Workplaces: Duke University
- Thesis: Diffraction by Cylindrical Reflectors (1956)
- Doctoral advisor: Samuel Silver

Robert Plonsey (July 17, 1924 – March 14, 2015) was the Pfizer-Pratt University Professor Emeritus of Biomedical Engineering at Duke University. He is noted for his work on bioelectricity.

== Education ==
Plonsey was born in New York City in 1924. He received the B.E.E. degree in electrical engineering from the Cooper Union School of Engineering in New York in 1943, and the M.E.E degree from New York University in 1948. He obtained his PhD from the University of California, Berkeley in 1957. In addition, he completed the first year and a half of the MD curriculum and the Case Western Reserve University School of Medicine (1969–1972).

== Career ==
Plonsey was a professor at Case Western Reserve University from 1968–1983, including a term as chair of the Department of Biomedical Engineering (1976–1980). In 1983, he moved to Duke University. He was a fellow of the American Association for the Advancement of Science and was elected as a member of the National Academy of Engineering in 1986 for "the application of electromagnetic field theory to biology, and for distinguished leadership in the emerging profession of biomedical engineering." He retired from Duke in 1996 as the Pfizer Inc./Edmund T. Pratt Jr. University Professor Emeritus of Biomedical Engineering.

== Research ==
Plonsey's research centered on bioelectric phenomena, including the electrical activity of nerves and muscle. With his student John Clark, he derived a mathematical relationship between the transmembrane potential and the extracellular potential produced by a propagating action potential in a nerve axon.

Some of Plonsey's most influential work addressed the electrical properties of the heart, often in collaboration with Roger Barr. They played a role in the development of the bidomain model, a mathematical model of the anisotropic electrical properties of cardiac muscle, and developed a hypothesis of the mechanism for defibrillation based on the idea that individual cardiac cells are depolarized on one end and hyperpolarized on the other during the shock, sometimes known as the saw-tooth model. Plonsey also collaborated with Yorum Rudy to calculate the relationship between body surface and epicardial electrical potentials, and with Frank Witkowski to analyze action potential wave fronts recorded during defibrillation shocks.

== Awards ==
Year	Award
1979	William Morlock Award from the IEEE Engineering in Medicine and Biology Society
1984	Centennial Medal from the IEEE Engineering in Medicine and Biology Society
1988	ALZA Distinguished Lecturer from the Biomedical Engineering Society (BMES)
1997	Merit Award from the International Union for Physiological & Engineering Science in Medicine
2000	Millennium Medal from the IEEE Engineering in Medicine and Biology Society
2004	Ragnar Granit Prize from the Ragnar Granit Foundation
2005	Theo Pilkington Outstanding Educator Award from the Biomedical Engineering Division of the American Society for Engineering Education
2013	IEEE Biomedical Engineering Award

== Books ==
Plonsey was the author of several books, including:

- Principles and Applications of Electromagnetic Fields coauthored with Robert Collin (McGraw-Hill, 1961)
- Bioelectric Phenomena (McGraw-Hill, 1969)
- Bioelectricity: A Quantitative Approach coauthored with Roger Barr (Springer, 3rd Ed., 2007)
- Bioelectromagnetism: Principles and Applications of Bioelectric and Biomagnetic Fields coauthored with Jaakko Malmivuo (Oxford University Press, 1995)
