= Leung Tsang =

American electrical engineer and academic

- Born: British Hong Kong
- Education: Massachusetts Institute of Technology (BS, MS, PhD)
- Scientific career
- Fields: Electrical engineering; Remote sensing; Geophysics
- Workplaces: Texas A&M University; University of Washington; University of Michigan
- Thesis: Theoretical models for subsurface geophysical probing with electromagnetic waves (1976)
- Doctoral advisor: Jin Au Kong

Leung Tsang is an American electrical engineer, who is a professor of Electrical Engineering and Computer Science at the University of Michigan. He is best known for his contributions to the theory and computation of wave scattering, rough surface scattering and microwave remote sensing.

== Biography ==
Leung Tsang was born and grew up in British Hong Kong. Completing high school education at Wah Yan College, he received S.B., S.M., and Ph.D. degrees all from the Department of Electrical Engineering and Computer Science of the Massachusetts Institute of Technology. During his doctoral studies, he was advised by Jin Au Kong.

From 1981 and 1983, he was with the Department of Electrical Engineering at Texas A&M University, where he became an assistant professor. From 1983 to 2014, he was a professor of Electrical Engineering at University of Washington, where he acted as a department chair from 2006 to 2011. In January 2015, he joined University of Michigan as a professor of Electrical Engineering and Computer Science.

Tsang is a fellow member of IEEE and Optica. He was the president of IEEE Geoscience and Remote Sensing Society from 2006 to 2007; previously, he served as the Editor-in-Chief of the IEEE Transactions on Geoscience and Remote Sensing, sponsored by the same society. In 2020, he was elected to the National Academy of Engineering for "contributions in wave scattering and microwave remote sensing theories for satellite missions."

== Selected publications ==
=== Books ===
- Tsang, L.; Kong, J. A.; Shin, R. (1985). Theory of Microwave Remote Sensing. Wiley.
- Tsang, L.; Kong, J. A.; Ding, K.H. (2000). Scattering of Electromagnetic Waves, Vol. 1: Theory and Applications. Wiley.
- Tsang, L.; Kong, J. A.; Ding, K.H.; Ao, C. O. (2000). Scattering of Electromagnetic Waves, Vol. 2: Numerical Simulations. Wiley.
- Tsang, L.; Kong, J. A. (2000). Scattering of Electromagnetic Waves, Vol. 3: Advanced Topics. Wiley.

=== Journal articles ===
- Tsang, L; Rader, D. (October 1979). "Numerical evaluation of the transient acoustic waveform due to a point source in a fluid-filled borehole". Geophysics. 44 (10): 1637–1769. Bibcode:1979Geop...44.1706T. doi:10.1190/1.1440932.
- Tsang, Leung; Ishimaru, Akira (1984). "Backscattering enhancement of random discrete scatterers". Journal of the Optical Society of America A. 1 (8): 836–839. Bibcode:1984JOSAA...1..836T. doi:10.1364/JOSAA.1.000836.
- Tsang, Leung; Chen, Chi-Te; Chang, Alfred T. C.; et al. (May–June 2000). "Dense media radiative transfer theory based on quasicrystalline approximation with applications to passive microwave remote sensing of snow". Radio Science. 35 (3): 731–749. Bibcode:2000RaSc...35..731T. doi:10.1029/1999RS002270.
- Chen, K.S.; Wu, Tzong-Dar; Tsang, Leung; et al. (January 2003). "Emission of rough surfaces calculated by the integral equation method with comparison to three-dimensional moment method simulations". IEEE Transactions on Geoscience and Remote Sensing. 41 (1): 90–101. Bibcode:2003ITGRS..41...90C. doi:10.1109/TGRS.2002.807587.
- Kelly, R. E.; Chang, A. T.; Tsang, L.; et al. (February 2003). "A prototype AMSR-E global snow area and snow depth algorithm". IEEE Transactions on Geoscience and Remote Sensing. 41 (2): 230–242. Bibcode:2003ITGRS..41..230K. doi:10.1109/TGRS.2003.809118.
