= David K. Cheng =

Chinese-American professor of electrical engineering

David Keun Cheng (January 10, 1918 – August 22, 2012) was a Chinese-born Professor of Electrical Engineering. He was known for his work in the field of electromagnetics. His 1983 undergraduate textbook Field and Wave Electromagnetics has been cited in more than 4000 publications and in 2016 is in the collections of about 500 libraries around the world.

== Early life and education ==
Cheng obtained his B.S. degree in Electrical Engineering from National Chiao Tung University in Shanghai in 1938, graduating at the head of his class. For the next five years, he worked as a research engineer with the Central Radio Corporation in China. He then went on to Harvard University, where he received his S.M. and Sc.D. degrees in 1944 and 1946 respectively. While at Harvard, he was a Charles Storrow Scholar and a Gordon McKay Scholar.

== Career ==
Dr. Cheng was a project engineer at the U.S.A.F. Cambridge Research Laboratories for 1946–48. In 1948, he joined the faculty of the Department of Electrical Engineering of Syracuse University and was appointed a full professor in 1955. Dr. Cheng taught and did research at Syracuse University until his retirement as Centennial Professor Emeritus in 1984. During his years with Syracuse University, he held many positions, including the faculty chairmanship of the Department of Electrical and Computer Engineering as well as that of the College of Engineering. He established the University's graduate center and served as its first academic chairman at Griffiss Air Force Base, Rome, NY (1952–53), at IBM in Endicott, NY (1953–54) and at IBM in Poughkeepsie, NY (1954–55). In recognition of his outstanding teaching and research, he was awarded the honor of Centennial Professor by Syracuse University in 1970, and he was the only professor in science and engineering so honored. In 1981, the University honored him again with the Chancellor's Citation for exceptional academic achievement.

== Books, awards, and achievements ==
Cheng has published four books: Analysis of Linear Systems (1959, translated into Chinese; Indian Student Edition, 1988), Field and Wave Electromagnetics (1st. ed. 1983, translated into Chinese, 2nd ed. 1989), Fundamentals of Engineering Electromagnetics (1993, translated into Spanish and Korean). He has authored or co-authored over 200 journal articles as well as many reports. He has won several best paper awards, an Achievement Award of the Chinese Institute of Engineers, a Distinguished Service Award of the Phi Tau Phi Scholastic Honor Society and an annual research award of the Society of Sigma Xi. He was a Life Fellow of the Institute of Electrical and Electronics Engineers (IEEE). a Fellow and Chartered Engineer of the British Institution of Electrical Engineers (IEE), and a Fellow of the American Association for the Advancement of Science. He was a member of the New York Academy of Sciences, Sigma Xi, and Eta Kappa Nu (Electrical Engineering Honorary).

In 1960–61 He was awarded a Guggenheim Fellowship to study and conduct research in London and Munich. He was selected by the National Academy of Sciences to be an Exchange Scientist to Hungary in 1972, to Yugoslavia in 1974, and to Poland and Romania in 1978. In 1975–76 he served as a Liaison Scientist at the London Branch of the Office of Naval Research. The IEEE Antenna and Propagation Society appointed him as the European Lecturer under the Distinguished Lecturer Program for the same period.

Cheng was a member of the IEEE Publications Board for 1968-70. He was the Consulting Editor of an Electrical Engineering Monograph Series for Intext Educational Publishers. From 1961 to 1978 he served as a Consulting Editor for Electrical Science books published by Addison Wesley Publishing Company. He was a consultant for GE, IBM, TRW and Syracuse Research Corporation.

He was an Honorary Professor of the Northwest Institute of Telecommunication Engineering, the Beijing University of Posts and Telecommunications and the Shanghai Jiao Tong University (SJTU). He was awarded an Honorary Doctor of Engineering degree by the National Chiao Tung University in Taiwan in 1985 as well as an Honorary Doctors degree by the Xidian University in Xi'an, China in 1998. He is listed in a number of biographical references, including Who's Who in America, Who's Who in American Education, Who's Who in Science and Engineering, Who's Who in Electromagnetics, Dictionary of International Biography (U.K.) and Who's Who Among Asian Americans.

In 1996, the centennial year of SJTU, Dr. Cheng established and funded an Award for Teaching and Research Excellence at the School of Electronics and Information Technology. Every year a selection committee is chosen to select one exceptional teacher, one outstanding research professor and three outstanding graduate students to receive the awards.

== See also ==
- List of textbooks in electromagnetism
