= Branko Popović (engineer) =

Serbian electrical engineer

Branko Popović (Serbian Cyrillic: Бранко Поповић; 24 February 1934 – 25 August 2002) was a Serbian engineer and academic. He taught at the University of Belgrade Faculty of Electrical Engineering. Popović was briefly a member of the Serbian parliament in 1993, serving as a non-party member of the Democratic Movement of Serbia (DEPOS).

== Early life and academic career ==
Popović was born in Belgrade, in what was then the Kingdom of Yugoslavia. Educated as an engineer, he was a recipient of the October Award of Belgrade in 1967 for his work on linear antennas. He later received the RT Belgrade Award (1971) and the Tesla Award (1985) and was a two-time recipient of the Yugoslav Society Award for ETAN (1981 and 1988). Popović became a corresponding member of the Serbian Academy of Sciences and Arts (SANU) in the Department of Technical Sciences in 1978 and a full member in 1988. He sought election as a vice-president of SANU in 1993–94 but was not successful.

== Political activism ==
During the 1990s, Serbian political life was dominated by the authoritarian rule of Slobodan Milošević, leader of the Socialist Party of Serbia (SPS). On 16 May 1992, Popović attended a meeting of Serbian opposition forces that called for the establishment of a united democratic movement, encompassing various opposition parties as well as other social interests and non-party academics. The Democratic Movement of Serbia (DEPOS) alliance was formally constituted at a follow-up meeting on 23 May, and Popović was named as a member of its inaugural governing council.

Popović was also selected in June 1992 as a member of the Crown Council of Alexander, Crown Prince of Yugoslavia, head of the royal house of the defunct Kingdom of Yugoslavia. In an interview with the newspaper Borba from this period, he advocated for a democratic parliamentary monarchy, urged Slobodan Milošević to stand down from office, and stressed the non-partisan nature of his own involvement with DEPOS.

In July 1992, Popović attended the founding convention of the Democratic Party of Serbia (DSS) as a guest.

Popović appeared in the ninth position on the DEPOS electoral list for the Belgrade constituency in the 1992 Serbian parliamentary election. The list won fifteen seats in the division, and in January 1993 he was chosen for a parliamentary mandate, serving as part of a six-member non-partisan/academic grouping within the ranks of the broader DEPOS delegation. (From 1992 to 2000, Serbia's electoral law stipulated that one-third of parliamentary mandates would be assigned to candidates from successful lists in numerical order, while the remaining two-thirds would be distributed amongst other candidates at the discretion of the sponsoring parties. Popović was not automatically elected by virtue of his list position, but he received a mandate all the same.)

The Socialist Party won the election overall, and the DEPOS members served in opposition. In the assembly, Popović served on the foreign affairs committee and the committee on transport and communications.

His time in parliament was ultimately brief. DEPOS began a boycott of the Serbian parliament soon after it was constituted, on the grounds that the Socialist government, working in conjunction with the far-right Serbian Radical Party (SRS), had unconstitutionally amended the law on elections to the Federal Republic of Yugoslavia's Chamber of Republics in a way that effectively blocked DEPOS members from serving in that body. When the constitutional court ruled in April 1993 that the amended law was valid, all six members of the non-partisan/academic group, including Popović, resigned from the Serbian parliament. Formally, his parliamentary term ended on 23 April 1993.

In an open letter, the members of the non-partisan/academic group said that "voters were deceived, and the deception was legalized" by the change in law and that neither the Serbian nor the federal parliament was capable of effective action for the benefit of the people or the state. This letter notwithstanding, there was speculation in the Serbian media that the group had more generally concluded DEPOS had exhausted its potential as a viable opposition movement.

Soon after his resignation, Popović was asked for his opinion on a letter sent by Serbian president Milošević, Yugoslavian president Dobrica Ćosić, and Montenegrin president Momir Bulatović, urging the Bosnian Serb assembly to accept the Vance-Owen peace plan to end the Bosnian War. Popović responded that the letter "came to late [...] when no effects could be expected of it anymore."

Popović remained active as a member of DEPOS after this time. In November 1993, he represented the party as a guest at a meeting of the Serbian Liberal Party (SLS). In the same period, he took part in discussions intended to unite the Serbian opposition in advance of in the 1993 Serbian parliamentary election. The DEPOS movement experienced a split in 1994, and Popović aligned himself at this time with Slobodan Rakitić's group, which later became known as the Parliamentary People's Party (SNS).

In December 1994, a group of Belgrade intellectuals, including both Popović and Milan St. Protić, proposed the creation of an Organization of the United Nations of Europe, which would deal primarily with European problems. The group contended that "the entire European space grew out of the same spiritual, religious and philosophical sources” and that therefore Europe “represents a profound, unified whole."

The Milošević regime fell in October 2000, and a new government comprising several formerly opposition parties came to power in Serbia. In June 2001, Popović took part in a round table discussion with Boris Tadić and others on a Draft Law on Telecommunications.

== Death ==
Popović died in Belgrade on 25 August 2002.
