= David Rutledge (engineer) =

David B. Rutledge (born 1952) is the Kiyo and Eiko Tomiyasu Professor (em.) of Engineering and former chair of the Division of Engineering and Applied Science at the California Institute of Technology (Caltech), United States. His earlier work on microwave circuits has been important for various advances in Wireless communications and has been useful for applications such as radar, remote sensing, and satellite broadcasting. He also covers research in estimating fossil-fuel supplies, and the implications for alternative energy sources and climate change.

== Education ==
Rutledge earned his bachelor's degree at Williams College, his Master of Arts degree from the University of Cambridge, and his doctorate from University of California, Berkeley.

== Career ==
He joined the Caltech faculty as an assistant professor in 1980, and rose through the faculty ranks to become the holder of the Tomiyasu chair in 2001. He served as executive officer for electrical engineering from 1999 to 2002 and chair of the Division of Engineering and Applied Science from 2005 to 2008. Rutledge was editor-in-chief of the journal IEEE Transactions on Microwave Theory and Techniques. He was also a member of Caltech's Lee Center for Advanced Networking, which aimed to create a global communication system that is as reliable and robust as a basic utility. Since 2018 he is a professor emeritus.

== Published works ==
Rutledge is the author of Energy: Supply and Demand, a book published by Cambridge University Press, December 2019. Focusing on trends in energy supply and demand, this text provides students with a comprehensive account of the subject and an understanding of how to use data analysis and modeling to make future projections and study climate impacts. Developments in technology and policy are discussed in depth, including the role of coal, the fracking revolutions for oil and gas, the electricity grid, wind and solar power, battery storage, and biofuels. Trends in demand are also detailed, with analysis of industrial demands such as LEDs, air conditioning, heat pumps, and information technology, and the transportation demands of railroads, ships, and cars (including electric vehicles). The environmental impacts of the energy industry are considered throughout, and a full chapter is dedicated to climate change. Real-life case studies and examples add context.

Rutledge is also the author of The Electronics of Radio, a book published by Cambridge University Press, as well as author or co-author of numerous other publications. This book provides an introduction to analog electronics by analyzing the design and construction of a radio transceiver. Essential theoretical background is provided at each step, along with carefully designed laboratory and homework exercises. The goal of this approach is to ensure a good grasp of basic electronics as well as an excellent foundation in wireless communications systems. The book begins with a thorough description of basic electronic components and simple circuits. Next, the key elements of radio electronics, including filters, amplifiers, oscillators, mixers, and antennas are described. In the laboratory exercises, the reader is led through the design, construction, and testing of a popular radio transceiver (the NorCal 40A), thereby illustrating and reinforcing the theoretical material. This book, the first to deal with elementary electronics in the context of radio, is often used as a textbook for introductory analog electronics courses, or for more advanced undergraduate classes on radio frequency electronics. It may also be of interest to electronics hobbyists and radio enthusiasts.

== Honors and activities ==
- Institute of Electrical and Electronics Engineers Millennium Medal
- Doug DeMaw Award of the American Radio Relay League
- National Science Foundation Presidential Investigator Award
- Japan Society for the Promotion of Science Fellowship
- Distinguished Lecturer, IEEE Antennas & Propagation Society
- Microwave Prize, IEEE Microwave Theory and Techniques Society
- Distinguished Educator Award, IEEE Microwave Theory and Techniques Society
- Fellow, Institute of Electrical and Electronics Engineers
- Teaching Award, Associated Students of Caltech
- Co-founder of the Wavestream Corporation, a company that produces solid-state microwave and millimeter-wave transmitters
- Six of Professor Rutledge's students have won Presidential Investigator and Career Awards
- Author of the electronics textbook, The Electronics of Radio
- Co-author of the microwave computer-aided design software package, Puff , which has distributed over 30,000 copies.
