= Fawwaz T. Ulaby =

Syrian American university professor

Fawwaz T. Ulaby فواز علبي
- Born: Damascus, Syria
- Citizenship: Syrian American; Syria, U.S.
- Education: American University of Beirut; University of Texas at Austin
- Known for: contributions to the science and technology of radar remote sensing and its applications.
- Awards: IEEE Electromagnetics Award (2001); IEEE Edison Medal (2006); IEEE James H. Mulligan Jr. Education Medal (2012)
- Scientific career
- Fields: Radio frequency (RF), Microwave, and Millimeter-wave Circuits; Computational electromagnetics; Advanced Electromagnetic Materials for RF and Microwave Applications; Antennas; Wave propagation; Space plasma electrodynamics; Microwave radiometers and Remote Sensing
- Workplaces: University of Michigan, Ann Arbor, Michigan; King Abdullah University of Science and Technology, Thuwal, Saudi Arabia
- Doctoral advisor: Archie W. Straiton

Fawwaz T. Ulaby (Arabic: فواز علبي) is Arthur F. Thurnau Professor of Electrical Engineering and Computer Science at the University of Michigan in Ann Arbor and formerly the Founding Provost and Executive Vice President of the King Abdullah University of Science and Technology (KAUST) and R. Jamieson and Betty Williams Professor of Electrical Engineering and Computer Science at the University of Michigan.

== Life ==
Ulaby was born in Damascus, Syria, and grew up in Lebanon. He attended the American University of Beirut, from which he received a B.S. degree in physics in 1964. He later received a Ph.D. in Electrical Engineering from the University of Texas at Austin in 1968.

After teaching at the University of Kansas he moved to the University of Michigan in Ann Arbor in the mid 1980s. He served as the R. Jamieson and Betty Williams Professor of Electrical Engineering and Computer Science, and has also served as the Vice President for Research.

Ulaby has done extensive work outside of academia as well, giving testimony to the House Science Committee of the US congress and serving on the board of directors for The Arab Community Center for Economic and Social Services (ACCESS).

In March 2008, Ulaby was named Founding Provost of the King Abdullah University of Science and Technology (KAUST). His daughter, Neda Ulaby, is a reporter at the NPR culture desk.

== Research areas ==
He is most famous for the development of micro-electronics for a suite of circuits and antennae for THz sensors and communication systems. Today, THz technology is an enabling technology in various types of industrial sensor applications.

Fawwaz, in the 1970s, also helped design the first radar to fly on a satellite for Skylab, the first US space station. He also served as founding director of the NASA-funded Center for Space Terahertz Technology at the University of Michigan.

== Honors ==
Professor Ulaby is a member of the U.S. National Academy of Engineering, Fellow of the American Association for the Advancement of Science (AAAS), and Fellow of the Institute of Electrical and Electronics Engineers (IEEE).

- IEEE GRSS Outstanding Service Award, 1982.
- IEEE GRSS Distinguished Achievement Award, 1983.
- IEEE Centennial Medal, 1984.
- NASA Group Achievement Award for the Shuttle Imaging Radar Science Team, 1990.
- IEEE Millennium Medal, 2000.
- IEEE Electromagnetics Award, 2001.
- William T. Pecora Award, 2001.
- IEEE Edison Medal, 2006.
- IEEE GRSS Education Award, 2006.
- IEEE James H. Mulligan Jr. Education Medal, 2012.

== See also ==
- List of textbooks in electromagnetism
