= Weng Cho Chew =

Malaysian-American electrical engineer

- 周永祖
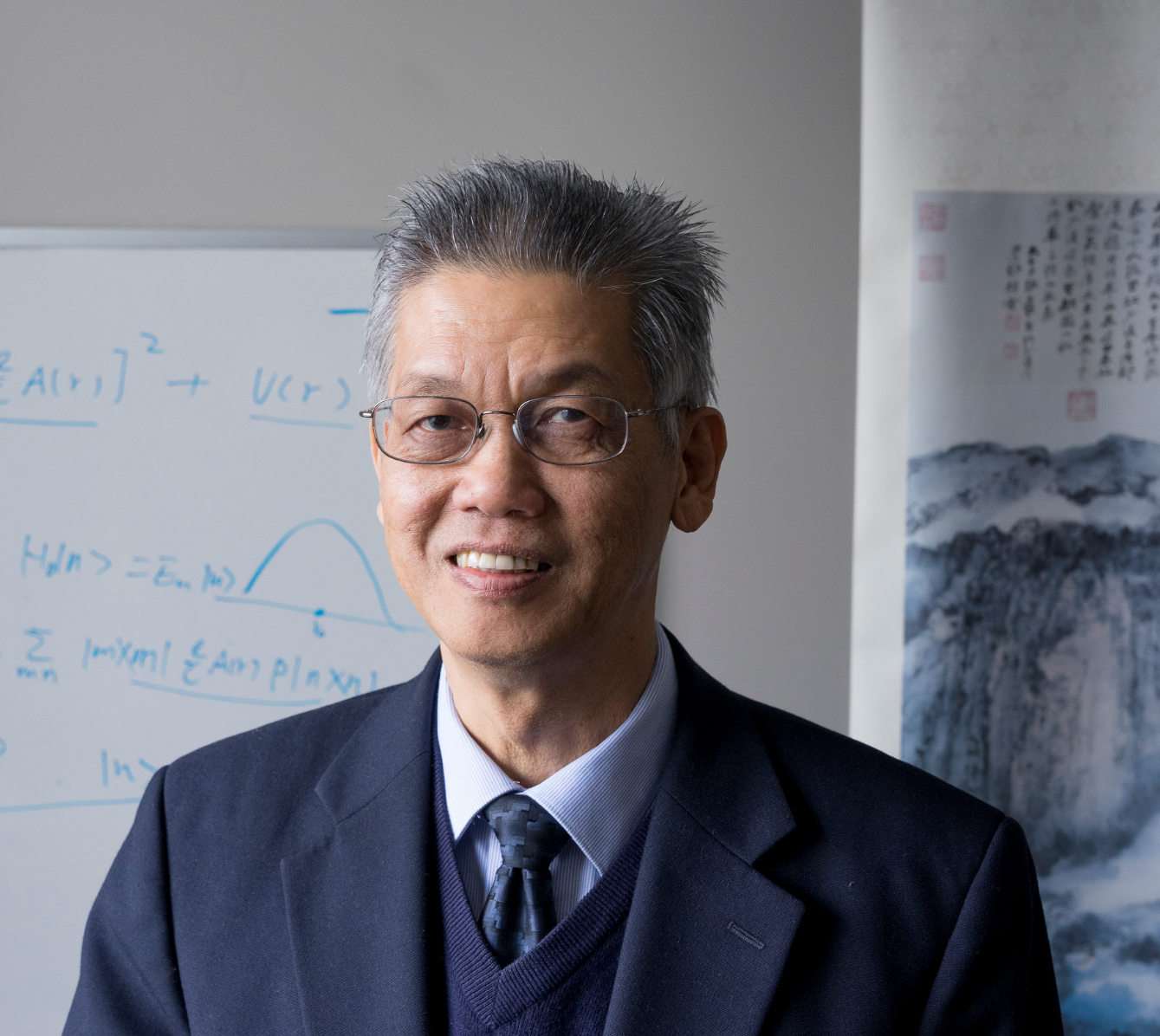
- Born: 1953 (age 72–73); Malaysia
- Citizenship: Malaysia; United States
- Education: Massachusetts Institute of Technology (BS, MS, PhD)
- Known for: Theory of waves in inhomogeneous media
- Scientific career
- Fields: Wave physics; Computational electromagnetics
- Workplaces: Schlumberger-Doll Research; University of Illinois at Urbana–Champaign; University of Hong Kong; Purdue University
- Thesis: Mixed boundary value problems in microstrip and geophysical probing applications (1980)
- Doctoral advisor: Jin Au Kong
- Doctoral students: Mahta Moghaddam
- Website: engineering.purdue.edu/wcchew

Weng Cho Chew (Chinese: 周永祖; (Note: pinyin: Zhōu Yǒngzǔ; Jyutping: Zau1 Wing5 Zou2; Pe̍h-ōe-jī: Chiu Éng-chó͘) born 1953) is a Malaysian-American electrical engineer and applied physicist known for contributions to wave physics, especially computational electromagnetics. He is a Distinguished Professor of Electrical and Computer Engineering at Purdue University.

== Career ==
Born in Malaysia, Chew received his bachelor's, master's and PhD degrees in electrical engineering from the Massachusetts Institute of Technology in 1976, 1978 and 1980, respectively. Following his doctoral studies, Chew joined Schlumberger-Doll Research in 1981 where he rose to the rank of department manager. In 1985, he accepted a position at the University of Illinois Urbana-Champaign, where he was director of the electromagnetics lab from 1995 to 2007. From 2007 to 2011, Chew served as dean of engineering at the University of Hong Kong. In 2017, Chew joined the school of electrical and computer engineering at Purdue University.

Chew's chief contributions are in the areas of waves in inhomogeneous media for various geophysical subsurface sensing and non-destructive testing applications, integrated circuits, microstrip antenna applications, fast and efficient algorithms for solving wave scattering and radiation problems, stretched coordinate perfectly matched layers, and inverse scattering using distorted Born approximation.

Chew has developed fast solvers that make it possible to simulate the electromagnetic behavior of structures of unprecedented sizes. Specifically, his group had the first working multilevel fast multipole algorithm (MLFMA) that when adopted by other groups, subsequently helped increase the size of solvable problems by six orders of magnitude. More recently, Chew has turned his attention toward combining quantum theory with electromagnetics, as well as combining computational electromagnetics with differential geometry. He has also recently derived quantum Maxwell's equations directly in coordinate space.

Chew is the author of Waves and Fields in Inhomogeneous Media (Van Nostrand Reinhold 1990; reprinted by IEEE Press, 1995), the co-author of Integral Equation Methods for Electromagnetic and Elastic Waves (Morgan & Claypool, 2008), and co-editor of Fast and Efficient Algorithms in Computational Electromagnetics (Artech House, 2001). In 2018, Chew served as President of the IEEE Antennas and Propagation Society. He is editor-in-chief of Progress in Electromagnetic Research and previously was editor-in-chief of the Journal of Electromagnetic Waves and Applications. He has helped organize the PIERS meetings around the world.

Notable students, postdoctoral researchers, visiting scholars of Chew include: Qing Huo Liu (Duke University, Eastern Institute for Advance Study, China), Mahta Moghaddam (University of Southern California), Fernando Teixeira (Ohio State University), Kaladhar Radhakrishnan (Intel), Lijun Jiang (Chinese University of Hong Kong, Missouri Tech, USA), Phil Atkins (KLA Tencor), Jiming Song (Iowa State University), Karl Warnick (Brigham Young University), Bill Weedon (Applied Radar), Larkin Hastriter (AFIT), Meisong Tong (Tongji U, China), Zaiping Nie (U Electronic Science Technology China), Shinichiro Ohnuki (Nihon University, Japan), Yumao Wu (Fudan University, China), Dong-Yeop Na (Pohang University of Science and Technology (POSTECH), Korea), Tie-Jun Cui (Southeast University, China), and Maokun Li (Tsinghua U, China).

== Awards and honors ==
Chew was elected Member of the National Academy of Engineering in 2013, “for contributions to large-scale computational electromagnetics of complex structures.” He is a Fellow of the Institute of Electrical and Electronics Engineers (IEEE) (1993), the Optical Society of America (2003), the Institute of Physics (2004), the Electromagnetics Academy (2007) and the Hong Kong Institution of Engineers (2009). Chew received the IEEE Electromagnetics Award in 2017, the Applied Computation Electromagnetics Society Award in Computational Electromagnetics in 2015, and the IEEE Antennas and Propagation Society Chen-To Tai Distinguished Educator Award in 2008, “[f]or outstanding contributions to education in the fields of electromagnetic theory and computational electromagnetics.” He also received the Sergei A. Schelkunoff Best Paper Award from IEEE Transactions on Antennas and Propagation (with Jun-Sheng Zhao) in 2001, the Campus Wide Excellence in Professional and Graduate Teaching Award from the University of Illinois Urbana-Champaign in 2001, and the IEEE Leon K. Kirchmayer Graduate Teaching Award in 2000, among other recognitions. He was among the few who won two IEEE Technical Fields Awards: Graduate Teaching, and Electromagnetics. Chew was named an ISI Highly Cited Researcher in 2001 and he was an honorary professor at Tsinghua University, China, honorary professor at National Taiwan University, Taipei, and was a distinguished visiting scholar at The University of Hong Kong. He was recently awarded the Pioneer Award by SPWLA.

== Publications ==
=== Books ===
- Chew WC, Waves and Fields in Inhomogeneous Media, Wiley-IEEE, 1995.
- Chew WC, Jin HM, Michielssen E, Song J, (Eds), Fast and Efficient Algorithms in Computational Electromagnetics, Artech House, 2001.
- Chew WC, Tong MS, Hu B, Integral Equation Methods for Electromagnetic and Elastic Waves, Springer, 2022.
- Tong MS, Chew WC, The Nyström Method in Electromagnetics, Wiley-IEEE, 2020.

=== Articles ===
- Xia, T., Atkins, P., Sha, W. E. I., & Chew, W. C. (open access) "Casimir Force: Vacuum Fluctuation, Zero-Point Energy, and Computational Electromagnetics," IEEE Antennas and Propagation Magazine. doi:10.1109/MAP.2021.3073118.
- Chew, W. C., Na, D.-Y., Roth, T. E., Ryu, C. J., & Kudeki, E. (2021) "Quantum Maxwell's Equations Made Simple," IEEE Antennas and Propagation Magazine.
- Volume: 63, Issue: 1, Feb.
- Na, D.-Y. & Chew, W. C. (2020) "Classical and Quantum Electromagnetic Interferences: What Is The Difference?," Progress In Electromagnetics Research, 168: 1–13.
- Na, D.-Y., Zhu, J., Chew, W. C., & Teixeira, F. L. (2020) "Quantum information preserving computational electromagnetics," Physical Review A, 102(1): 013711.
- Na, D.-Y. Na & Chew, W. C. (2020) "Quantum Electromagnetic Finite-Difference Time Domain Solver," Quantum Reports, 2: 253–265.
- Chew, W. C., Liu, A. Y., Salazar-Lazaro, C., Na, D.-Y., & Sha, W. E. I. (2019) "Hamilton Equations, Commutator, and Energy Conservation," Quantum Reports, 1: 295–303.
- Sha, W. E. I., Liu, A. Y., and Chew, W. C. (2018) "Dissipative quantum electromagnetics," IEEE Journal on Multiscale and Multiphysics Computational Techniques, 3:198–213.
- Chen, S. C., & Chew, W. C. (2017) "Numerical electromagnetic frequency domain analysis with discrete exterior calculus," Journal of Computational Physics, 350:668–689.
- Chew, W. C. (2016) "Quantum mechanics made simple: Lecture notes UIUC," http://wcchew.ece.illinois.edu/chew/course/QMAll20161206.pdf.
- Chew, W. C., Liu, A. Y., Salazar-Lazaro, C., & Sha, W. E. I. (2016) "Quantum Electromagnetics: A New Look—Part I," IEEE Journal on Multiscale and Multiphysics Computational Techniques, 1:73–84.
- Chew, W. C., Liu, A. Y., Salazar-Lazaro, C., & Sha, W. E. I. (2016) "Quantum Electromagnetics: A New Look—Part II," IEEE Journal on Multiscale and Multiphysics Computational Techniques, 1: 85–97.
- Dai, Q. I., Liu, Q. S., Gan, H. U., & Chew, W. C. (2015) "Combined field integral equation-based theory of characteristic mode," IEEE Transactions on Antennas and Propagation, 63(9): 3973–3981.
- Atkins, P. R., Chew, W. C., Li, M., Sun, L. E., Ma, Z. H., & Jiang, L. J. (2014) "Casimir force for complex objects using domain decomposition techniques," Progress In Electromagnetics Research, 149: 275–280.
- Chew, W.C. (2014) "Vector potential electromagnetics with generalized gauge for inhomogeneous media: Formulation." Progress In Electromagnetics Research, 149: 69–84.
- Atkins, P. R., Dai, Q. I., Sha, W. E. I., & Chew, W. C. (2013) "Casimir Force for Arbitrary Objects Using the Argument Principle and Boundary Element Methods," Progress In Electromagnetics Research, 142: 615–624.

== See also ==
- Characteristic mode analysis
- List of textbooks in electromagnetism
