= Journal of Electromagnetic Waves and Applications =

- Discipline: Electromagnetism
- Language: English
- Edited by: Pankaj Kumar Choudhury, Mohamad Abou El-Nasr

Publication details
- History: 1987–present
- Publisher: Taylor & Francis
- Frequency: 18/year
- Impact factor: 1.1 (2024)

Standard abbreviations
- ISO 4: J. Electromagn. Waves Appl.

Indexing
- ISSN: 0920-5071 (print); 1569-3937 (web)
- LCCN: 88659289
- OCLC no.: 57072422

Links
- Journal homepage; Online access; Online archive

The Journal of Electromagnetic Waves and Applications is a peer-reviewed scientific journal published by Taylor & Francis in 18 issues per year. It covers electromagnetic wave theory and its applications, including but not limited to wave propagation, antenna theory, photonics, and electromagnetic compatibility. The editors-in-chief are Pankaj Kumar Choudhury (National University of Malaysia) and Mohamad Abou El-Nasr (Arab Academy for Science, Technology & Maritime Transport). The founding editor-in-chief of the journal was Jin Au Kong.

== Abstracting and indexing ==
The journal is abstracted and indexed in:

- Current Contents/Engineering, Computing & Technology
- EBSCO databases
- Ei Compendex
- Inspec
- Science Citation Index Expanded
- Scopus
- Zentralblatt MATH

According to the Journal Citation Reports, the journal has a 2024 impact factor of 1.1.
