= Parametrization (geometry) =

Describing something mathematical with variables

In mathematics, and more specifically in geometry, parametrization (or parameterization; also parameterisation, parametrisation) is the process of finding parametric equations of a curve, a surface, or, more generally, a manifold or a variety, defined by an implicit equation. The inverse process is called implicitization. "To parameterize" by itself means "to express in terms of parameters".

Parametrization is a mathematical process consisting of expressing the state of a system, process or model as a function of some independent quantities called parameters. The state of the system is generally determined by a finite set of coordinates, and the parametrization thus consists of one function of several real variables for each coordinate. The number of parameters is the number of degrees of freedom of the system.

For example, the position of a point that moves on a curve in three-dimensional space is determined by the time needed to reach the point when starting from a fixed origin. If x, y, z are the coordinates of the point, the movement is thus described by a parametric equation

$$\begin{align}
x&=f(t)\\y&=g(t)\\z&=h(t),
\end{align}$$

where t is the parameter and denotes the time. Such a parametric equation completely determines the curve, without the need of any interpretation of t as time, and is thus called a parametric equation of the curve (this is sometimes abbreviated by saying that one has a parametric curve). One similarly gets the parametric equation of a surface by considering functions of two parameters t and u.

== Non-uniqueness ==
Parametrizations are not generally unique. The ordinary three-dimensional object can be parametrized (or "coordinatized") equally efficiently with Cartesian coordinates (x, y, z), cylindrical polar coordinates (ρ, φ, z), spherical coordinates (r, φ, θ) or other coordinate systems.

Similarly, the color space of human trichromatic color vision can be parametrized in terms of the three colors red, green and blue, RGB, or with cyan, magenta, yellow and black, CMYK.

== Dimensionality ==
Generally, the minimum number of parameters required to describe a model or geometric object is equal to its dimension, and the scope of the parameters—within their allowed ranges—is the parameter space. Though a good set of parameters permits identification of every point in the object space, it may be that, for a given parametrization, different parameter values can refer to the same point. Such mappings are surjective but not injective. An example is the pair of cylindrical polar coordinates (ρ, φ, z) and (ρ, φ + 2π, z).

== Invariance ==
As indicated above, there is arbitrariness in the choice of parameters of a given model, geometric object, etc. Often, one wishes to determine intrinsic properties of an object that do not depend on this arbitrariness, which are therefore independent of any particular choice of parameters. This is particularly the case in physics, wherein parametrization invariance (or 'reparametrization invariance') is a guiding principle in the search for physically acceptable theories (particularly in general relativity).

For example, whilst the location of a fixed point on some curved line may be given by a set of numbers whose values depend on how the curve is parametrized, the length (appropriately defined) of the curve between two such fixed points will be independent of the particular choice of parametrization (in this case: the method by which an arbitrary point on the line is uniquely indexed). The length of the curve is therefore a parametrization-invariant quantity. In such cases parametrization is a mathematical tool employed to extract a result whose value does not depend on, or make reference to, the details of the parametrization. More generally, parametrization invariance of a physical theory implies that either the dimensionality or the volume of the parameter space is larger than is necessary to describe the physics (the quantities of physical significance) in question.

Though the theory of general relativity can be expressed without reference to a coordinate system, calculations of physical (i.e. observable) quantities such as the curvature of spacetime invariably involve the introduction of a particular coordinate system in order to refer to spacetime points involved in the calculation. In the context of general relativity then, the choice of coordinate system may be regarded as a method of 'parametrizing' the spacetime, and the insensitivity of the result of a calculation of a physically-significant quantity to that choice can be regarded as an example of parametrization invariance.

As another example, physical theories whose observable quantities depend only on the relative distances (the ratio of distances) between pairs of objects are said to be scale invariant. In such theories any reference in the course of a calculation to an absolute distance would imply the introduction of a parameter to which the theory is invariant.

== Examples ==
- Boy's surface
- McCullagh's parametrization of the Cauchy distributions
- Parametrization (climate), the parametric representation of general circulation models and numerical weather prediction
- Singular isothermal sphere profile
- Lambda-CDM model, the standard model of Big Bang cosmology

== Techniques ==
- Feynman parametrization
- Schwinger parametrization
- Solid modeling
- Dependency injection
