= Schuhmann =

Schuhmann is a surname. Notable people with the surname include:

- Bernd Schuhmann (born 1964), German politician
- Carl Schuhmann (1869–1946), German athlete
- Emil Schuhmann German accordionist
- Heiner Schuhmann (born 1948), German footballer
- Walter Schuhmann (1898–1956), German politician
- Winfried Otto Schumann (1888–1974), German physicist
