= Sau Lan Wu =

American physicist

- 吳秀蘭
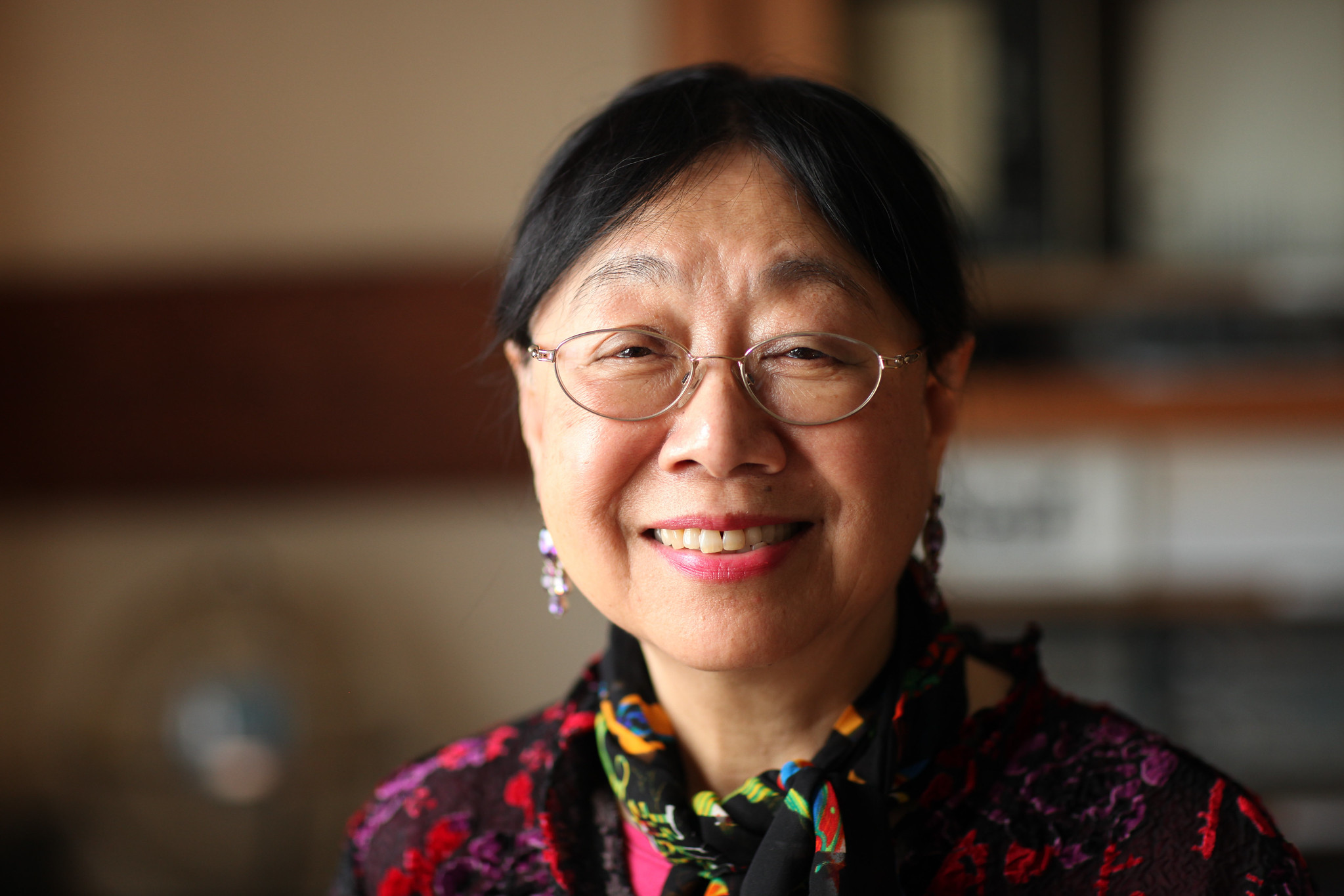
- Sau Lan Wu, October 2012
- Born: May 11, 1940 (age 86); Hong Kong
- Other name: 吴秀兰
- Education: Vassar College (AB); Harvard University (MA, PhD)
- Spouse: Tai Tsun Wu
- Scientific career
- Fields: Particle physics
- Workplaces: Massachusetts Institute of Technology (1970–77); University of Wisconsin, Madison (1977–2026); DESY (1977–86); CERN (1975–77, 1986–)
- Thesis: Proton Compton scattering at high energies near the forward direction (1970)

Sau Lan Wu (Chinese: 吳秀蘭; born May 11, 1940) is a Chinese-American particle physicist and the Enrico Fermi Distinguished Professor of Physics at the University of Wisconsin-Madison. She made important contributions towards the discovery of the J/psi particle, which provided experimental evidence for the existence of the charm quark, and the gluon, the vector boson of the strong force in the Standard Model of physics. Her team located at the European Organization for Nuclear Research (CERN), using data collected at the Large Hadron Collider (LHC), was part of the international effort in the discovery of a boson consistent with the Higgs boson.

== Early life ==
Wu was born in the early 1940s during the Japanese occupation of Hong Kong and went to Vassar College in 1960 with a full scholarship for her undergraduate degree. Initially, she dreamed of becoming a painter, but was inspired by Marie Curie to devote her life to physics. During her years at Vassar, she spent a summer at Brookhaven National Laboratory where the science of particle physics captivated her.

During her freshman year she and a few more of her Vassar schoolmates were invited to the White House for an Easter function and met Jacqueline Kennedy, a Vassar alumna (class of 1951). She first experienced racial discrimination when visiting the Supreme Court and was confronted with the choice of "black" or "white" on the door to the restroom.

== Academic background ==
Wu graduated from Vassar College (1963) with an A.B. in physics. In 1964, Wu received her M.A. in physics as part of the first cohort of women awarded graduate degrees directly by Harvard University. After earning a Ph.D. (1970) in physics from Harvard University, she conducted research at MIT, DESY and the University of Wisconsin-Madison, where she was the Enrico Fermi Distinguished Professor of Physics until her retirement in 2026. Since 1986, Wu has been the Visiting Scientist at CERN conducting research with the LHC as part of the ATLAS team.

== Achievements ==
=== J/psi ===
Sau Lan was part of the team led by Samuel C.C. Ting at MIT who discovered the J/psi particle in 1974, for which Ting was awarded the 1976 Nobel Prize in Physics together with Burton Richter. The MIT team where Sau Lan Wu was a postdoc at the time took advantage of the Alternating Gradient Synchrotron accelerator at Brookhaven National Laboratory with high-intensity proton beams, which bombarded a stationary target to produce showers of particles that were detected by particle detectors. They discovered a strong peak in electron-positron Invariant mass at an energy of 3.1 billion electron volts (GeV). This led them to suspect that they had discovered a new stable particle decaying into electron-positron pairs, the same one found by Richter at the SPEAR collider in the SLAC National Accelerator Laboratory.

=== Gluon ===
Wu was a key contributor to the discovery of the gluon, a particle that binds, or glues, quarks together to form protons and neutrons. For her effort, Sau Lan Wu and her collaborators were awarded the 1995 European Physical Society High Energy and Particle Physics Prize. The smoking gun signature proving the existence of the gluon were the so-called 'three jet events' occurring in electron-positron annihilation into a quark-antiquark pair, where an additional gluon is radiated from one of the quarks, creating the third jet. In the late 1970s Wu joined the TASSO Collaboration that operated at the PETRA accelerator at DESY. In 1979 she published a paper with George Zobernig on a method of three-jet analysis in electron-positron annihilation, that was used in the following publication with the entire TASSO Collaboration, regarded as the first evidence of a gluon.

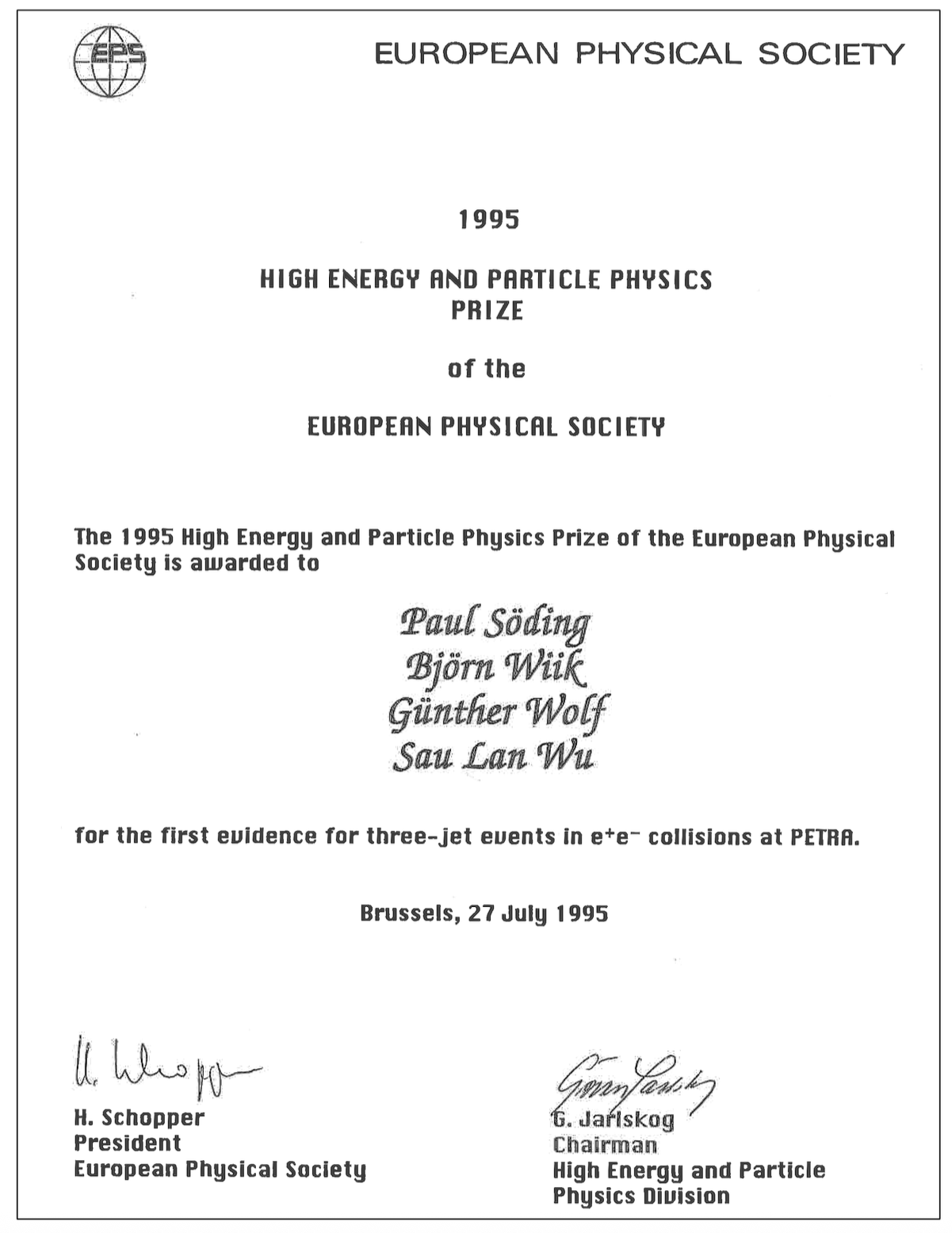
Award certificate of 1995 EPS Physics Prize in Brussels, Belgium.

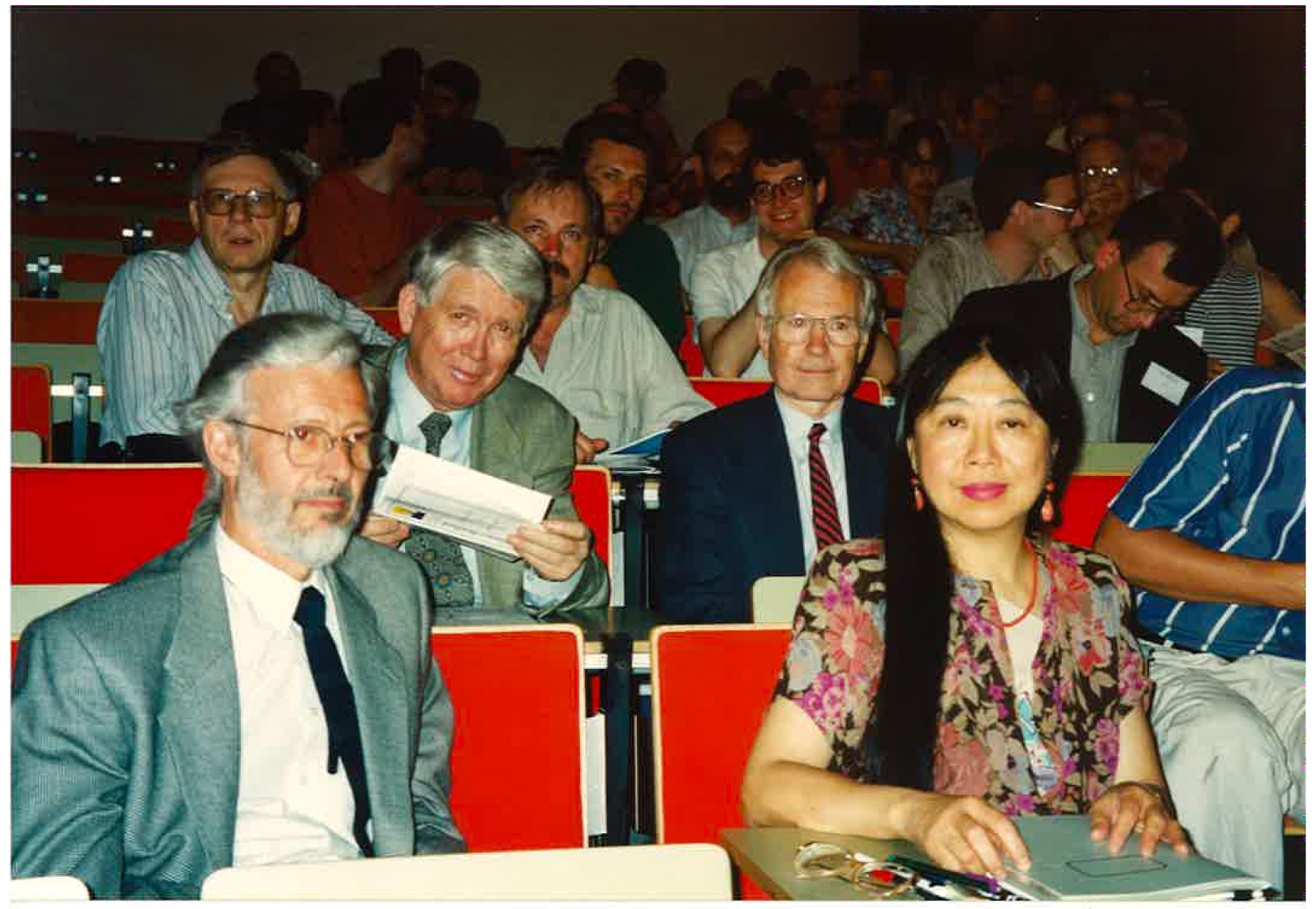
The four Prize Recipients at the ceremony of the 1995 European Physical Society High Energy and Particle Physics Prize in Brussels, Belgium. Front row: Günter Wolf and Sau Lan Wu; second row: Björn Wiik and Paul Söding.

Working from first principles, Wu calculated that a collision energy of roughly 22 GeV would be needed to cleanly resolve a three-jet signature, close to PETRA's planned operating energy, and worked out with her postdoctoral researcher Georg Zobernig how to disentangle the three overlapping jets, based on the insight that the quark, antiquark, and gluon jets must lie in a common "event plane."

When the PETRA accelerator's energy first exceeded Wu's calculated threshold in May–June 1979, Wu and Zobernig used their method to identify the first three-jet event recorded at PETRA. Bjørn Wiik presented the result, crediting Wu and Zobernig, at the "Neutrino '79" conference in Bergen, Norway, in June 1979, where TASSO's three-jet observation was the only such result among the four PETRA experiments; Wu and Zobernig documented the finding that month in TASSO Note No. 84, and further three-jet events were presented by Paul Söding at the European Physical Society Conference in Geneva the following month. The other three PETRA collaborations—JADE, Mark J, and PLUTO—developed comparable analyses over the following months, and all four experiments reported confirming evidence by the International Symposium on Lepton-Photon Interactions at Fermilab in August 1979. In September 1980, using the same three-jet analysis techniques, TASSO further established that the new particle carried spin 1, as predicted for the gluon, completing its experimental identification.

The 1995 European Physical Society High Energy and Particle Physics Prize was awarded to Paul Söding, Bjørn Wiik, Günter Wolf, and Sau Lan Wu of the TASSO Collaboration for this work, and Wu delivered the acceptance speech on behalf of the recipients; the Society separately recognized all four PETRA experiments for their collective experimental confirmation of the gluon.

=== Higgs boson ===
Wu's team in Wisconsin was the first American group to join the ATLAS Collaboration at CERN, in 1993, however, her hunt for the Higgs Boson had started earlier at the Large Electron–Positron (LEP) Collider also at CERN. Together with other scientists at LEP they observed a number of Higgs boson candidates, but the observation was not statistically significant and they were only able to set a lower limit on the mass of the hypothetical Higgs Boson particle at 114.4 GeV (at the 95% confidence level). In 2000 CERN had shut the LEP collider so that the Large Hadron Collider could be built in its place.

On July 4, 2012, following the immense efforts of the ATLAS and CMS Collaborations, CERN announced the discovery of a boson consistent with the predicted characters of Higgs boson with a mass of 125 GeV. This was a statistically significant discovery at the level of 5-sigma, a term meaning that the odds it occurred by chance are less than 1 in 3.5 million. This discovery completes the Standard Model of particle physics which explains most of the phenomena in the visible Universe.

Wu is credited as a significant contributor to the discovery with her Wisconsin's group work on the two key decay channels that led to the discovery of the Higgs boson, the decay of the Higgs boson into two gamma-rays (H→ɣɣ), and the decay of the Higgs boson into four leptons (H→ZZ*→4ℓ).

In March 2013, Wu was pictured with Peter Higgs and a few other leading CERN researchers on the front page of the Science Times section of The New York Times for Dennis Overbye's feature "Chasing the Higgs".

In her later research, Wu worked on applications of artificial intelligence and quantum computing in high-energy physics. She was corresponding author of a 2021 study applying a quantum-kernel machine-learning method to Higgs-boson production in association with top quarks at the LHC. In 2022, at the invitation of Nature Reviews Physics, Wu and Shinjae Yoo published an article on the challenges and opportunities of quantum machine learning in high-energy physics.

=== Mentorship ===
Sau Lan Wu has supervised 65 doctoral students and mentored numerous postdoctoral researchers across the TASSO, ALEPH, BaBar, and ATLAS experiments. . As of 2026, 42 of her former students and postdoctoral researchers had become university faculty members, 18 had obtained permanent staff positions at major high-energy-physics laboratories, and 34 held positions in industry.

== Honors ==
- Outstanding Junior Investigator Award of U.S. Department of Energy, 1980
- Romnes Faculty Award, University of Wisconsin, Madison 1981
- Hilldale Professorship, University of Wisconsin, Madison 1991
- Fellow, American Physical Society 1992
- High Energy and Particle Physics Prize of the European Physical Society 1995, with Paul Söding, Björn Wiik, and Günter Wolf, for the discovery of the gluon.
- Fellow, American Academy of Arts and Sciences 1996
- Vilas Professorship, University of Wisconsin, Madison 1998
- Wu delivered Vassar College's 150th Commencement Address in 2014, becoming the first physicist to give the college's commencement address.
- Sau Lan Wu has been featured in several books as an inspiring scientist figure for young students. The books include : A New York Times Best Seller "Women in Science – 50 fearless pioneers who changed the world", "This Little Scientist : A Discovery Primer", "Good Night Stories for Rebel Girls: 100 Immigrant Women Who Changed the World", "How to Be Extraordinary", "Scientists Alphabet Book by Christi Sperber", "Bold Women in Science: 15 Women in History You Should Know" by Danni Washington and "50 Women in Technology" by Georgina Ferry, Bridget Greenwood and Ines Almeida.
- Minor planet 177770 SaulanWu, discovered by astronomers with the Mount Lemmon Survey in 2005, was named in her honor. The official naming citation was published by International Astronomical Union's WG Small Body Nomenclature (WGSBN) bulletin and Minor Planet Center on 23 May 2022.
- Phi Beta Kappa Excellence in Teaching Award, University of Wisconsin–Madison, 2021.
- Distinguished Achievement Award, Alumnae/i Association of Vassar College, 2023.
- Breakthrough Prize in Fundamental Physics, 2025, as a member of the ATLAS Collaboration.

== Books ==
- Sau Lan Wu edited a Memorial Volume for her late husband and theoretical physicist Tai Tsun Wu, along with Hung Cheng, Wasikul Islam, Barry McCoy, John Myers, Per Osland and Shaojun Sun, which was published by World Scientific in 2025.
