= Paul Söding =

German physicist

Paul Heinrich Söding (born 20 February 1933 in Dresden, Germany) is a German physicist. He is best known for his work in particle physics and as former director of research of the German particle physics lab DESY.

== Career ==
Paul Söding studied physics at the University of Hamburg and the Ludwig-Maximilians-Universität München in Germany. He was the first doctoral student of Willibald Jentschke in Hamburg. In 1964, he received his doctorate from the University of Hamburg. He subsequently did research at the University of California, Berkeley, Cornell University in New York, and the European particle physics research lab CERN.

In 1969, he became senior scientist at the Deutsches Elektronen-Synchrotron (DESY) in Hamburg. There he and his colleagues at the TASSO detector used the PETRA positron-electron accelerator to observe the first direct evidence of the gluon, the elementary particle that mediates the strong nuclear force. For that discovery, he was awarded, together with Bjørn Wiik, Günter Wolf, and Sau Lan Wu, with the Prize for High Energy and Particle Physics of the European Physical Society. As research director at DESY from 1982 until 1991, he contributed to the research program at the HERA accelerator.

His efforts to get the Tetraelectronvolt Energy Superconducting Linear Accelerator (TESLA) built at DESY were not successful. The project was, however, merged into the International Linear Collider (ILC) plans.

After the German reunification in 1990, the former GDR institute for high energy physics at Zeuthen near Berlin was integrated into DESY. Paul Söding became director of this institute in 1991. It is mainly due to his efforts that the Zeuthen institute has gained global recognition. He retired from this position in 1998. In 1998, he was granted emeritus status.

In 1995, he was awarded the High Energy Particle Physics Prize of the European Physical Society, together with Bjorn H. Wiik, Gunter Wolf, Sau Lan Wu, "for the first evidence for three-jet events in e+e- collisions at PETRA". In 2001, his efforts were recognized with the German Federal Cross of Merit (First Class) Medal awarded by the German President.

As of 2012, he is still active at the Humboldt University of Berlin.

== Publications ==
He was co-author of the "Review of particle properties" for several years. He was one of the original members of the "Meson Team" later renamed to the Particle Data Group. He left the team in 1975. He wrote and co-authored several books in English and German and many papers on particle physics.
