= Schumann resonances =

Global electromagnetic resonances, generated and excited by lightning discharges

A simplified artistic animation of Schumann resonance in Earth's atmosphere.

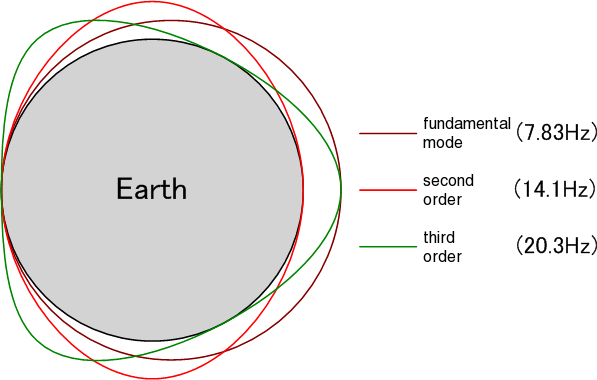
A diagram of Schumann resonances in Earth's atmosphere

The Schumann resonances (SR) are a set of spectral peaks in the extremely low frequency portion of the Earth's electromagnetic field spectrum. They are global electromagnetic resonances generated and excited by lightning discharges in the cavity formed by the Earth's surface and the ionosphere.

== Description ==
The global electromagnetic resonance phenomenon is named after physicist Winfried Otto Schumann, who predicted it mathematically in 1952. Schumann resonances are the principal background in the part of the electromagnetic spectrum from 3 Hz through 60 Hz and appear as distinct peaks at extremely low frequencies around 7.83 Hz (fundamental), 14.1, 20.3, 26.3, and 32.5 Hz. These correspond to wavelengths of 38000, 21000, 14000, 11000 and 9000 km.

Schumann resonances occur because the space between the surface of the Earth and the conductive ionosphere acts as a closed, although variable-sized, waveguide. The limited dimensions of the Earth cause this waveguide to act as a resonant cavity for electromagnetic waves in the extremely low frequency band. The cavity is naturally excited by electric currents in lightning.

In the normal mode descriptions of Schumann resonances, the fundamental mode is a standing wave in the Earth–ionosphere cavity with a wavelength equal to the circumference of the Earth. The lowest-frequency mode has the highest intensity, and the frequency of all modes can vary slightly owing to solar-induced perturbations to the ionosphere (which compress the upper wall of the closed cavity) amongst other factors. The higher resonance modes are spaced at approximately 6.5 Hz intervals (as may be seen by feeding numbers into the formula), a characteristic attributed to the atmosphere's spherical geometry. The peaks exhibit a spectral width of approximately 20% due to the damping of the respective modes in the dissipative cavity.

Observations of Schumann resonances have been used to track global lightning activity. Owing to the connection between lightning activity and the Earth's climate it has been suggested that they may be used to monitor global temperature variations and variations of water vapor in the upper troposphere. Schumann resonances have been used to study the lower ionosphere on Earth and it has been suggested as one way to explore the lower ionosphere on celestial bodies. Some have proposed that lightning on other planets might be detectable and studied by means of Schumann resonance signatures of those planets.

Interest in Schumann resonances renewed in 1993 when E.R. Williams showed a correlation between the resonance frequency and tropical air temperatures, suggesting the resonance could be used to monitor global warming. In geophysical survey, Schumann resonances are used to locate offshore hydrocarbon deposits.

== History ==
In 1893, George Francis FitzGerald noted that the upper layers of the atmosphere must be fairly good conductors. Assuming that the height of these layers is about 100 km above ground, he estimated that oscillations (in this case the lowest mode of the Schumann resonances) would have a period of 0.1 second. Because of this contribution, it has been suggested to rename these resonances "Schumann–FitzGerald resonances". However, FitzGerald's findings were not widely known, as they were only presented at a meeting of the British Association for the Advancement of Science, followed by a brief mention in a column in Nature.

The first suggestion that an ionosphere existed, capable of trapping electromagnetic waves, is attributed to Heaviside and Kennelly (1902). It took another twenty years before Edward Appleton and Barnett in 1925 were able to prove experimentally the existence of the ionosphere.

Although some of the most important mathematical tools for dealing with spherical waveguides were developed by G. N. Watson in 1918, it was Winfried Otto Schumann who first studied the theoretical aspects of the global resonances of the earth–ionosphere waveguide system, known today as the Schumann resonances. In 1952–1954 Schumann, together with H. L. König, attempted to measure the resonant frequencies. However, it was not until measurements made by Balser and Wagner in 1960–1963 that adequate analysis techniques were available to extract the resonance information from the background noise. Since then there has been an increasing interest in Schumann resonances in a wide variety of fields.

== Basic theory ==
Lightning discharges are considered to be the primary natural source of Schumann resonance excitation; lightning channels behave like huge antennas that radiate electromagnetic energy at frequencies below about 100 kHz. These signals are very weak at large distances from the lightning source, but the Earth–ionosphere waveguide behaves like a resonator at extremely low resonance frequencies.

In an ideal cavity, the resonant frequency of the $n$-th mode $f_{n}$ is determined by the Earth radius $a$ and the speed of light $c$.

$$f_{n} =\frac{c}{2 \pi a}\sqrt{n(n+1)}$$

The real Earth–ionosphere waveguide is not a perfect electromagnetic resonant cavity. Losses due to finite ionosphere electrical conductivity lower the propagation speed of electromagnetic signals in the cavity, resulting in a resonance frequency that is lower than would be expected in an ideal case, and the observed peaks are wide. In addition, there are a number of horizontal asymmetries—day-night difference in the height of the ionosphere, latitudinal changes in the Earth's magnetic field, sudden ionospheric disturbances, polar cap absorption, variation in the Earth radius of ± 11 km from equator to geographic poles, etc. that produce other effects in the Schumann resonance power spectra.

== Measurements ==
Today Schumann resonances are recorded at many separate research stations around the world. The sensors used to measure Schumann resonances typically consist of two horizontal magnetic inductive coils for measuring the north–south and east–west components of the magnetic field, and a vertical electric dipole antenna for measuring the vertical component of the electric field. A typical passband of the instruments is 3–100 Hz. The Schumann resonance electric field amplitude (~300 microvolts per meter) is much smaller than the static fair-weather electric field (~150 V/m) in the atmosphere.

Similarly, the amplitude of the Schumann resonance magnetic field (~1 picotesla) is many orders of magnitude smaller than the Earth's magnetic field (~30–50 microteslas). Specialized receivers and antennas are needed to detect and record Schumann resonances. The electric component is commonly measured with a ball antenna, suggested by Ogawa et al., in 1966, connected to a high-impedance amplifier. The magnetic induction coils typically consist of tens- to hundreds-of-thousands of turns of wire wound around a core of very high magnetic permeability.

=== Dependence on global lightning activity ===
From the very beginning of Schumann resonance studies, it was known that they could be used to monitor global lightning activity. At any given time there are about 2000 thunderstorms around the globe. Producing approximately 50 lightning events per second, these thunderstorms are directly linked to the background Schumann resonance signal.

Determining the spatial lightning distribution from Schumann resonance records is a complex problem. To estimate the lightning intensity from Schumann resonance records it is necessary to account for both the distance to lightning sources and the wave propagation between the source and the observer. A common approach is to make a preliminary assumption on the spatial lightning distribution, based on the known properties of lightning climatology. An alternative approach is placing the receiver at the North or South Pole, which remain approximately equidistant from the main thunderstorm centers during the day.

One method not requiring preliminary assumptions on the lightning distribution is based on the decomposition of the average background Schumann resonance spectra, utilizing ratios between the average electric and magnetic spectra and between their linear combination. This technique assumes the cavity is spherically symmetric and therefore does not include known cavity asymmetries that are believed to affect the resonance and propagation properties of electromagnetic waves in the system.

==== Diurnal variations ====
The best documented and the most debated features of the Schumann resonance phenomenon are the diurnal variations of the background Schumann resonance power spectrum.

A characteristic Schumann resonance diurnal record reflects the properties of both global lightning activity and the state of the Earth–ionosphere cavity between the source region and the observer. The vertical electric field is independent of the direction of the source relative to the observer, and is therefore a measure of global lightning.

The diurnal behavior of the vertical electric field shows three distinct maxima, associated with the three "hot spots" of planetary lightning activity: one at 9 UT (Universal Time) linked to the daily peak of thunderstorm activity from Southeast Asia; one at 14 UT linked to the peak of African lightning activity; and one at 20 UT linked to the peak of South American lightning activity. The time and amplitude of the peaks vary throughout the year, linked to seasonal changes in lightning activity.

===== "Chimney" ranking =====
In general, the African peak is the strongest, reflecting the major contribution of the African "chimney" to global lightning activity. The ranking of the two other peaks—Asian and American—is the subject of a vigorous dispute among Schumann resonance scientists. Schumann resonance observations made from Europe show a greater contribution from Asia than from South America, while observations made from North America indicate the dominant contribution comes from South America.

Williams and Sátori suggest that in order to obtain "correct" Asia-America chimney ranking, it is necessary to remove the influence of the day/night variations in the ionospheric conductivity (day-night asymmetry influence) from the Schumann resonance records. The "corrected" records presented in the work by Sátori, et al. show that even after the removal of the day-night asymmetry influence from Schumann resonance records, the Asian contribution remains greater than American.

Similar results were obtained by Pechony et al. who calculated Schumann resonance fields from satellite lightning data. It was assumed that the distribution of lightning in the satellite maps was a good proxy for Schumann excitations sources, even though satellite observations predominantly measure in-cloud lightning rather than the cloud-to-ground lightning that are the primary exciters of the resonances. Both simulations—those neglecting the day-night asymmetry, and those taking this asymmetry into account—showed the same Asia-America chimney ranking. On the other hand, some optical satellite and climatological lightning data suggest the South American thunderstorm center is stronger than the Asian center.

The reason for the disparity among rankings of Asian and American chimneys in Schumann resonance records remains unclear, and is the subject of further research.

===== Influence of the day-night asymmetry =====
In the early literature, the observed diurnal variations of Schumann resonance power were explained by the variations in the source-receiver (lightning-observer) geometry. It was concluded that no particular systematic variations of the ionosphere (which serves as the upper waveguide boundary) are needed to explain these variations. Subsequent theoretical studies supported the early estimations of the small influence of the ionosphere day-night asymmetry (difference between day-side and night-side ionosphere conductivity) on the observed variations in Schumann resonance field intensities.

The interest in the influence of the day-night asymmetry in the ionosphere conductivity on Schumann resonances gained new strength in the 1990s, after publication of a work by Sentman and Fraser developed a technique to separate the global and the local contributions to the observed field power variations using records obtained simultaneously at two stations that were widely separated in longitude. They interpreted the diurnal variations observed at each station in terms of a combination of a diurnally varying global excitation modulated by the local ionosphere height.

Their work, which combined both observations and energy conservation arguments, convinced many scientists of the importance of the ionospheric day-night asymmetry and inspired numerous experimental studies. Recently it was shown that results obtained by Sentman and Fraser can be approximately simulated with a uniform model (without taking into account ionosphere day-night variation) and therefore cannot be uniquely interpreted solely in terms of ionosphere height variation.

Schumann resonance amplitude records show significant diurnal and seasonal variations which generally coincide in time with the times of the day-night transition (the terminator). This time-matching seems to support the suggestion of a significant influence of the day-night ionosphere asymmetry on Schumann resonance amplitudes. There are records showing almost clock-like accuracy of the diurnal amplitude changes.

On the other hand, there are numerous days when Schumann resonance amplitudes do not increase at sunrise or do not decrease at sunset. There are studies showing that the general behavior of Schumann resonance amplitude records can be recreated from diurnal and seasonal thunderstorm migration, without invoking ionospheric variations. Two recent independent theoretical studies have shown that the variations in Schumann resonance power related to the day-night transition are much smaller than those associated with the peaks of the global lightning activity, and therefore the global lightning activity plays a more important role in the variation of the Schumann resonance power.

It is generally acknowledged that source-observer effects are the dominant source of the observed diurnal variations, but there remains considerable controversy about the degree to which day-night signatures are present in the data. Part of this controversy stems from the fact that the Schumann resonance parameters extractable from observations provide only a limited amount of information about the coupled lightning source-ionospheric system geometry. The problem of inverting observations to simultaneously infer both the lightning source function and ionospheric structure is therefore extremely underdetermined, leading to the possibility of non-unique interpretations.

==== "Inverse problem" ====
One of the interesting problems in Schumann resonances studies is determining the lightning source characteristics (the "inverse problem"). Temporally resolving each individual flash is impossible because the mean rate of excitation by lightning, ~50 lightning events per second globally, mixes up the individual contributions together. However, occasionally extremely large lightning flashes occur which produce distinctive signatures that stand out from the background signals. Called "Q-bursts", they are produced by intense lightning strikes that transfer large amounts of charge from clouds to the ground and often carry high peak current.

Q-bursts can exceed the amplitude of the background signal level by a factor of 10 or more and appear with intervals of ~10 s, which allows them to be considered as isolated events and determine the source lightning location. The source location is determined with either multi-station or single-station techniques and requires assuming a model for the Earth–ionosphere cavity. The multi-station techniques are more accurate, but require more complicated and expensive facilities.

=== Transient luminous events research ===
It is now believed that many of the Schumann resonances transients (Q bursts) are related to the transient luminous events (TLEs). In 1995, Boccippio et al. showed that sprites, the most common TLE, are produced by positive cloud-to-ground lightning occurring in the stratiform region of a thunderstorm system, and are accompanied by Q-burst in the Schumann resonances band. Recent observations reveal that occurrences of sprites and Q bursts are highly correlated and Schumann resonances data can possibly be used to estimate the global occurrence rate of sprites.

==== Global temperature ====
Williams [1992] suggested that global temperature may be monitored with the Schumann resonances. The link between Schumann resonance and temperature is lightning flash rate, which increases nonlinearly with temperature. The nonlinearity of the lightning-to-temperature relation provides a natural amplifier of the temperature changes and makes Schumann resonance a sensitive "thermometer". Moreover, the ice particles that are believed to participate in the electrification processes which result in a lightning discharge have an important role in the radiative feedback effects that influence the atmosphere temperature. Schumann resonances may therefore help us to understand these feedback effects. A paper was published in 2006 linking Schumann resonance to global surface temperature, which was followed up with a 2009 study.

==== Upper tropospheric water vapor ====
Tropospheric water vapor is a key element of the Earth's climate, which has direct effects as a greenhouse gas, as well as indirect effects through interaction with clouds, aerosols and tropospheric chemistry. Upper tropospheric water vapor (UTWV) has a much greater impact on the greenhouse effect than water vapor in the lower atmosphere, but whether this impact is a positive or a negative feedback is still uncertain.

The main challenge in addressing this question is the difficulty in monitoring UTWV globally over long timescales. Continental deep-convective thunderstorms produce most of the lightning discharges on Earth. In addition, they transport large amount of water vapor into the upper troposphere, dominating the variations of global UTWV. Price [2000] suggested that changes in the UTWV can be derived from records of Schumann resonances.

== On other planets and moons ==
The existence of Schumann-like resonances is conditioned primarily by two factors:

1. A closed, planetary-sized and ellipsoidial cavity, consisting of conducting lower and upper boundaries separated by an insulating medium. For the earth the conducting lower boundary is its surface, and the upper boundary is the ionosphere. Other planets may have similar electrical conductivity geometry, so it is speculated that they should possess similar resonant behavior.
2. A source of electrical excitation of electromagnetic waves in the extremely low frequency range.

Within the Solar System there are five candidates for Schumann resonance detection besides the Earth: Venus, Mars, Jupiter, Saturn, and Saturn's biggest moon Titan. Modeling Schumann resonances on the planets and moons of the Solar System is complicated by the lack of knowledge of the waveguide parameters. No in situ capability exists today to validate the results.

=== Venus ===
The strongest evidence for lightning on Venus comes from the electromagnetic waves first detected by Venera 11 and 12 landers. Theoretical calculations of the Schumann resonances at Venus were reported by Nickolaenko and Rabinowicz [1982] and Pechony and Price [2004]. Both studies yielded very close results, indicating that Schumann resonances should be easily detectable on that planet given a lightning source of excitation and a suitably located sensor.

=== Mars ===
In the case of Mars there have been terrestrial observations of radio emission spectra that have been associated with Schumann resonances. The reported radio emissions are not of the primary electromagnetic Schumann modes, but rather of secondary modulations of the nonthermal microwave emissions from the planet at approximately the expected Schumann frequencies, and have not been independently confirmed to be associated with lightning activity on Mars. There is the possibility that future lander missions could carry in situ instrumentation to perform the necessary measurements. Theoretical studies are primarily directed to parameterizing the problem for future planetary explorers.

Detection of lightning activity on Mars has been reported by Ruf et al. [2009]. The evidence is indirect and in the form of modulations of the nonthermal microwave spectrum at approximately the expected Schumann resonance frequencies. It has not been independently confirmed that these are associated with electrical discharges on Mars. In the event confirmation is made by direct, in situ observations, it would verify the suggestion of the possibility of charge separation and lightning strokes in the Martian dust storms made by Eden and Vonnegut [1973] and Renno et al. [2003].

Martian global resonances were modeled by Sukhorukov [1991], Pechony and Price [2004], and Molina-Cuberos et al. [2006]. The results of the three studies are somewhat different, but it seems that at least the first two Schumann resonance modes should be detectable. Evidence of the first three Schumann resonance modes is present in the spectra of radio emission from the lightning detected in Martian dust storms.

=== Titan ===
It was long ago suggested that lightning discharges may occur on Titan, but recent data from Cassini–Huygens seems to indicate that there is no lightning activity on this largest satellite of Saturn. Due to the recent interest in Titan, associated with the Cassini–Huygens mission, its ionosphere is perhaps the most thoroughly modeled today. Schumann resonances on Titan have received more attention than on any other celestial body, in works by Besser et al. [2002], Morente et al. [2003], Molina-Cuberos et al. [2004], Nickolaenko et al. [2003], and Pechony and Price [2004]. It appears that only the first Schumann resonance mode might be detectable on Titan.

Since the landing of the Huygens probe on Titan's surface in January 2005, there have been many reports on observations and theory of an atypical Schumann resonance on Titan. After several tens of fly-bys by Cassini, neither lightning nor thunderstorms were detected in Titan's atmosphere. Scientists therefore proposed another source of electrical excitation: induction of ionospheric currents by Saturn's co-rotating magnetosphere. All data and theoretical models comply with a Schumann resonance, the second eigenmode of which was observed by the Huygens probe. The most important result of this is the proof of existence of a buried liquid water-ammonia ocean under a few tens of km of the icy subsurface crust.

=== Jupiter and Saturn ===
Lightning activity has been optically detected on Jupiter. Existence of lightning activity on that planet was predicted by Bar-Nun [1975] and it is now supported by data from Galileo, Voyagers 1 and 2, Pioneers 10 and 11, and Cassini. Saturn is also confirmed to have lightning activity. Though three visiting spacecraft (Pioneer 11 in 1979, Voyager 1 in 1980, and Voyager 2 in 1981) failed to provide any convincing evidence from optical observations, in July 2012 the Cassini spacecraft detected visible lightning flashes, and electromagnetic sensors aboard the spacecraft detected signatures that are characteristic of lightning.

Little is known about the electrical parameters of the interior of Jupiter or Saturn. Even the question of what should serve as the lower waveguide boundary is a non-trivial one in case of the gaseous planets. There seem to be no works dedicated to Schumann resonances on Saturn. To date there has been only one attempt to model Schumann resonances on Jupiter.

Here, the electrical conductivity profile within the gaseous atmosphere of Jupiter was calculated using methods similar to those used to model stellar interiors, and it was pointed out that the same methods could be easily extended to the other gas giants Saturn, Uranus and Neptune. Given the intense lightning activity at Jupiter, the Schumann resonances should be easily detectable with a sensor suitably positioned within the planetary-ionospheric cavity.

== In popular culture ==
In the 1998 Japanese cyberpunk anime series Serial Experiments Lain, this concept is the building block to establish a global communication between the human subconscious and the machines.

== See also ==
- Cymatics
- The Hum
- Plasma (physics)
- Radiant energy
- Telluric current
- Schumann resonances conspiracy theories

== External articles and references ==
General references

- Articles on the NASA ADS Database: Full list | Full text
- Sprite research video: The A.C. global circuit Schumann resonances oscillate at only eight cycles per second

Websites

- "Construction and Deployment of an ULF Receiver for the Study of Schumann Resonance in Iowa" by Anton Kruger—Well illustrated study from the University of Iowa
- Global Coherence Initiative (Spectrogram Calendar) Schumann resonance live data
- Space Observing System Schumann resonance live data
- The Discovery of Schumann Resonance
- Dunning, Brian (March 5, 2013). "Skeptoid #352: Facts and Fiction of the Schumann Resonance". Skeptoid.

Animation

- Schumann resonance animation from NASA Goddard Space Flight Center
