= Tai Tsun Wu =

Chinese-American physicist (1933–2024)

- Born: December 1, 1933; Shanghai, Republic of China
- Died: July 19, 2024 (aged 90); Palo Alto, California, U.S.
- Education: University of Minnesota (BS); Harvard University (MS, PhD)
- Known for: Wu–Yang dictionary; Wu–Yang monopole; Cheng–Wu theorem
- Spouse: Sau Lan Wu
- Scientific career
- Fields: Physics
- Workplaces: Harvard University
- Thesis: I. The Concept of Impedance II. High Frequency Scattering (1956)
- Doctoral advisor: Ronold W. P. King

Tai Tsun Wu (simplified Chinese: 吴大峻; traditional Chinese: 吳大峻; pinyin: Wú Dàjùn, December 1, 1933 – July 19, 2024) was a Chinese-born American physicist and writer well known for his contributions to high-energy nuclear physics, statistical mechanics and antenna theory. He was married to experimental physicist Sau Lan Wu.

== Life ==
Born in Shanghai, he studied electrical engineering at University of Minnesota and became a William Lowell Putnam Mathematical Competition fellow (1953). He obtained an S.M. (1954) and Ph.D. (1956) in applied physics from Harvard University. His thesis concerned I. The Concept of Impedance II. High Frequency Scattering and was advised by Ronold W. P. King. At Harvard, he continued as Junior Fellow in the Society of Fellows (1956–59), joined the faculty of applied physics (1959) and was the Gordon McKay Professor of Applied Physics & Professor of Physics. Wu has also had visiting appointments with Rockefeller University (1966), at the DESY in Hamburg, Germany (1971), at CERN in Geneva, Switzerland and Utrecht University (1977).

He has studied statistical mechanics on Bose–Einstein condensation in an external potential, classical electromagnetic theory (1960). With Hung Cheng, he used gauge quantum field theory to predict the unboundedly increasing total scattering cross sections at very high energies, experimentally verified at CERN and Tevatron collider. Wu studied production processes for the Large Hadron Collider, in particular to predict the production cross section of a Higgs particle with low momentum together with two forward jets.

His studies with Chen Ning Yang include CP violation, globalization of the gauge theory, Wu–Yang monopole, and the Wu–Yang dictionary. More recently, Wu has studied quantum information processing based on the Schrödinger equation without any spatial dimension in the modeling and application of quantum memories. He published his last research paper on Concept of the basic standard model and a relation between the three gauge coupling constants at the age of 90 along with his wife Sau Lan Wu. He died on July 19, 2024 at the Stanford Hospital in Palo Alto, California.

== Honours and awards ==
- Fellow of the American Academy of Arts and Sciences, 1977
- Academician of Academia Sinica, Taiwan, 1980
- The Humboldt Prize, 1985
- Dannie Heineman Prize for Mathematical Physics with Barry M. McCoy and Alexander Zamolodchikov, 1999
- World Scientific published a Memorial Volume for Tai Tusn Wu in 2025, edited by Sau Lan Wu, Hung Cheng, Wasikul Islam, Barry McCoy, John Myers, Per Osland and Shaojun Sun.

== Books ==
- The Scattering and Diffraction of Waves (Harvard University Press, 1959). With Ronold W. P. King.
- The Two-dimensional Ising model (Harvard University Press, 1973). With Barry M. McCoy
- Antennas in Matter: Fundamentals, Theory, and Applications (with R. W. P. King, G. S. Smith, and M. Owens), M.I.T. Press, 1981.
- Expanding Protons: Scattering at High Energies (MIT Press, 1987). With Hung Cheng
- The Ubiquitous Photon: Helicity Methods for QED and QCD (Oxford University Press, 1990). With Raymond Gastmans
- Lateral Electromagnetic Waves: Theory and Applications to Communications, Geophysical Exploration, and Remote Sensing (Springer-Verlag, 1992). With Ronold W. P. King and Margaret Owens
