= Bjørn Wiik =

Norwegian physicist

- Born: 17 February 1937; Bruvik, Norway
- Died: 26 February 1999 (aged 62); Appel, Germany
- Scientific career
- Fields: Particle physics
- Institutions: Stanford Linear Accelerator Center; German Electron Synchrotron (DESY)

Bjørn Håvard Wiik (born 17 February 1937 in Bruvik, Norway; died 26 February 1999 in Appel, Germany) was a Norwegian elementary particle physicist, notable for his role in the experiment that produced the first experimental evidence for gluons and for his influential role on later accelerator projects. Wiik was director of DESY, in Hamburg, Germany, from 1993 until his death.

== Biography ==
Bjørn Wiik was born in Bruvik on 17 February 1937. During World War II he was evacuated to England via a British submarine, due to his father being a leader of the Norwegian resistance movement. He attended high school in Bergen and moved to Germany to study physics at the Technische Universität Darmstadt. In 1965, he got his doctorate degree there. Two years later he began working at the Stanford Linear Accelerator Center in Menlo Park, California. In 1972, Wiik returned to Germany, to the German Electron Synchrotron (DESY) in Hamburg where, four years later, he was appointed lead scientist.

In 1978, Wiik and his collaborators began using DESY's newly commissioned PETRA electron–positron storage ring to look for hard-gluon bremsstrahlung events that would provide experimental support for the existence and role of gluons in mediating strong interactions among quarks. Wiik and his team soon observed and reported a type of event never described before: three particle-jets whose momenta lay in a plane. These results, widely believed to represent the after-effects of two quarks plus a gluon, were soon confirmed by many other groups. In 1995, the European Physical Society awarded its Prize for High Energy and Particle Physics to four physicists representing the TASSO collaboration (Paul Söding, Bjørn Wiik, Günter Wolf, and Sau Lan Wu) for demonstrating the existence of the gluon.

Already during his stay at SLAC, Wiik had proposed a new type of particle accelerator, which would be based on colliding a beam of protons with a beam of electrons. In 1980, this idea took concrete form with the creation at DESY of the hadron-electron ring facility HERA). Wiik was also responsible for proposing and overseeing the implementation of a superconducting linear accelerator for Tera-electronvolt energies, TESLA.

Wiik was chairman of the Super Proton Synchrotron Experiments Committee (SPSC) at CERN from 1979 to 1980 and of the International Committee for Future Accelerators, a working group of the International Union of Pure and Applied Physics, from 1997 to 1999.

He was elected a Fellow of the American Physical Society in 1989 "for his contributions to the realization of the large electron-proton colliding beam facility, HERA, at the Deutsches Electron Synschotron Laboratory in Hamburg, West Germany"

In 1995 he was awarded the High Energy Particle Physics Prize of the European Physical Society, together with Paul Soding, Gunter Wolf, Sau Lan Wu, "for the first evidence for three-jet events in e+e- collisions at PETRA".

Wiik died on 26 February 1999 in Appel at the age of 62 due to "an accident at home".
