= Fritz Borgnis =

Fritz Edward Borgnis
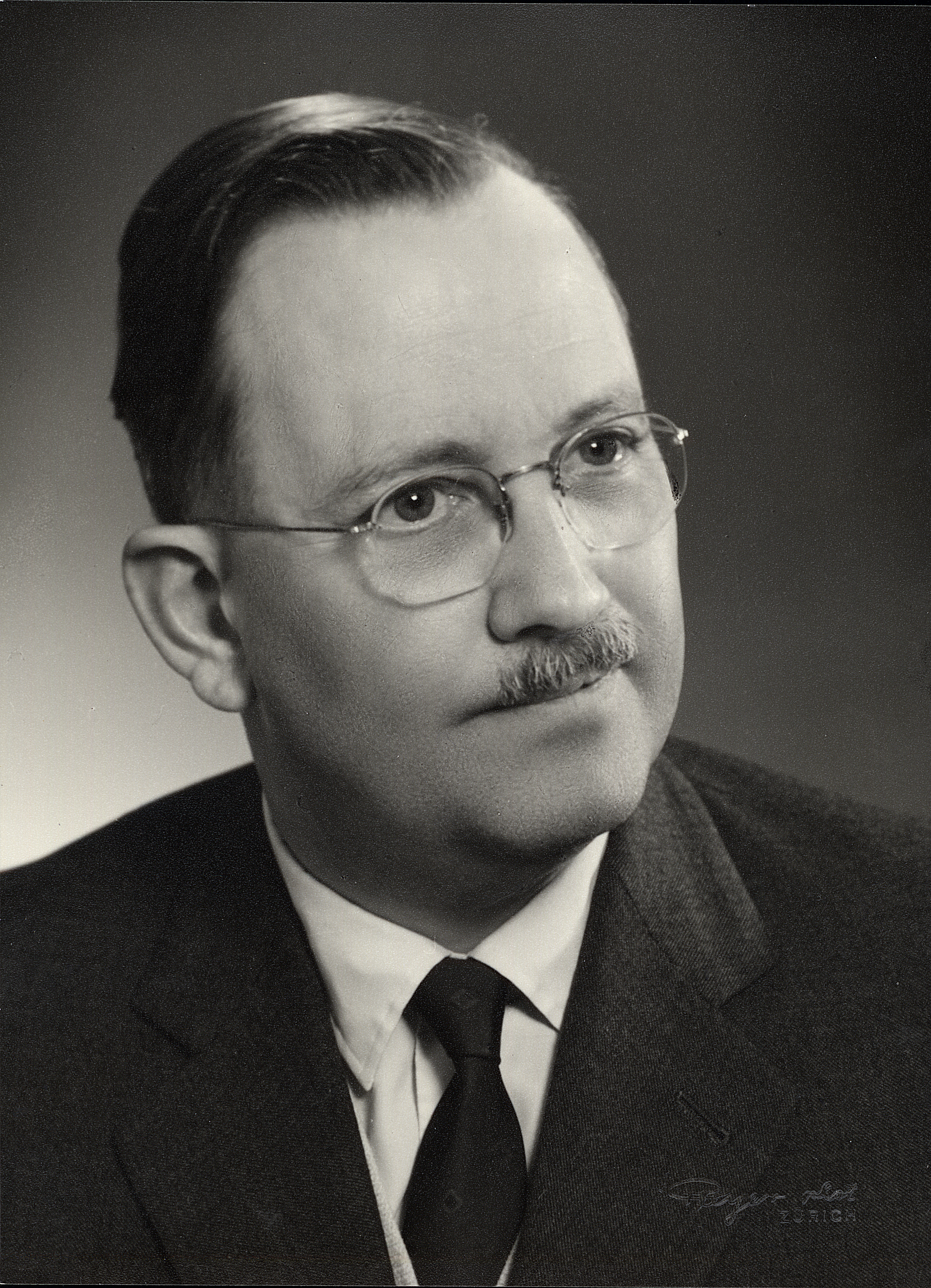
- Born: December 24, 1906; Mannheim, Germany
- Died: August 27, 1982 (aged 75); Zurich, Switzerland
- Education: Technische Hochschule München; Ludwig-Maximilians-Universität München
- Known for: Notable contributions in microwave physics and ultrasonic measurements.
- Scientific career
- Fields: Electrical Engineering, Physics
- Workplaces: University of Graz; Philips; ETH Zurich
- Doctoral advisor: Winfried Otto Schumann

Fritz E. Borgnis (December 24, 1906 – August 27, 1982) was a German applied physicist and electrical engineer, known for his contributions to microwave physics, guided waves and ultrasonic measurements for medical diagnostics.

== Background ==
Borgnis was born on December 24, 1906, in Mannheim, Germany. After completing high school in Hamburg, he matriculated at the Technische Hochschule München where he received a diploma in electrical engineering in 1929. He continued at the Ludwig-Maximilians-Universität München and obtained an engineering degree ( Dr. Ing.) in the field of current flow by convection and diffusion. He continued his academic career at the University of Graz followed by two years at the ETH Zurich from 1948 until 1950. During the next seven years, he worked and taught at various universities in the USA. From 1957 until 1960, Borgnis acted as director of research at the Allgemeine Deutsche Philips Industrie in Hamburg. 1960 Borgnis accepted a faculty position at the ETH in Zurich. He became full professor for high-frequency electronics.

From the early 1960s, Borgnis' projects at ETH dealt with measurements of flow in liquids using ultrasound. Several publications describe the progress achieved as pioneers in this field. Initial experiments were performed in blood vessels of dogs. Later, experiments to measure the flow in human blood vessels were conducted.

Borgnis retired in 1977 after working and teaching at the ETH during 17 years.

== Books ==
- Electromagnetic Waveguides and Resonators, in Handbuch der Physik, vol. XVI, (Springer-Verlag, 1958). With Charles H. Papas
- Randwertprobleme der Mikrowellenphysik (Springer-Verlag, 1955). With Charles H. Papas

== Awards ==
- Fellow of the American Physical Society
- Fellow of the Institute of Electrical and Electronics Engineers
- Fellow of the Acoustical Society of America
