= Chen-To Tai =

American engineer and academic (1915–2004)

- 戴振铎
- Born: December 30, 1915; Luzhi, Jiangsu, Republic of China
- Died: July 30, 2004 (aged 88); Ann Arbor, Michigan, U.S.
- Education: Tsinghua University; Harvard University
- Known for: Contribution to electromagnetic and antenna theory
- Scientific career
- Fields: Electrical engineering; Antenna theory
- Workplaces: Stanford Research Institute; Ohio State University; Instituto Tecnológico de Aeronáutica; KMS Industries; University of Michigan
- Thesis: Theory of Coupled Antennas and Its Applications (1947)
- Doctoral advisor: Ronold W. P. King

Chen-To Tai (Chinese: 戴振铎; December 30, 1915 — July 30, 2004) was a Chinese-born American electrical engineer and physicist, who was a Professor Emeritus at Department of Electrical and Computer Engineering at University of Michigan. He was best known for his fundamental contributions to electromagnetic and antenna theory.

== Life and career ==
Chen-To Tai was born on December 30, 1915 in Luzhi, Jiangsu, Republic of China. He has received bachelor’s degree in physics from Tsinghua University in 1937. From 1937 to 1943, he served as an assistant at National Southwestern Associated University following the merger of Tsinghua University during the Second Sino-Japanese War. Tai also served for two years as a communications officer with the rank of major during the war. After obtaining a scholarship from Harvard University in 1943, he immigrated to the United States. At Harvard University, he was advised by Ronold W. P. King; he received master's degree in communication engineering in 1944, followed by a doctoral degree in 1947.

After receiving his doctoral degree, Tai continued working at Harvard University as a research fellow until 1949: in that year, he accepted a position as a research physicist at Stanford Research Institute. From 1954 to 1956, he was appointed as an associate professor of electrical engineering at Ohio State University. In 1956, he relocated to Brazil to take a faculty position at the Instituto Tecnológico de Aeronáutica, becoming fluent in Portuguese. Returning to OSU in 1961, he joined the Radiation Laboratory at University of Michigan in 1964 as a professor. Being co-affiliated with the KMS Industries from 1967 to 1969, he served as a faculty member at University of Michigan until his retirement in 1986.

Tai was married to Jia-Ming Shen and had five children. He was a practising Buddhist. He died on July 30, 2004 in Ann Arbor, Michigan and was survived by his wife, as well as his children and 10 grandchildren.

== Research and awards ==
Tai was known for his seminal contributions to antennas and electromagnetic theory, including the development of the theoretical foundation of multi-element antenna array as well as the extension of the biconical antenna theory. His 1971 textbook, Dyadic Green’s Functions in Electromagnetic Theory, popularized the use of Green’s functions in diffraction and antenna analysis. He became a Fellow of the IEEE in 1962 and was elected as the president of its Antenna and Propagation Society in 1971. In 1987, he was elected as a member of National Academy of Engineering "for basic contributions to the advancement of electromagnetic theory and its application to antenna design." Receiving the IEEE Centennial Medal in 1984, he was awarded with IEEE Heinrich Hertz Medal in 1998 "for outstanding contributions to electromagnetic and antenna theory and the development and application of Green's dyadic." Chen-To Tai Distinguished Educator Award, given yearly by IEEE Antenna and Propagation Society to educators in the field of antennas and propagation, is named in honor of him.

== Selected publications ==
Books

- Tai, Chen-To (1971). Dyadic Green Functions in Electromagnetic Theory. Intext Educational Publishers. ISBN 9780700223459.
- Tai, Chen-to (1997). General Vector and Dyadic Analysis: Applied Mathematics in Field Theory. Wiley-Interscience. ISBN 9780780334137.

Book chapters

- Sengupta, D. L.; Tai, C. -T. (1976). "Radiation and reception of transients by linear antennas". In Felsen, Leopold B. (ed.). Transient Electromagnetic Fields. Springer. pp. 181–235. ISBN 978-3-662-30907-0.

Journal articles

- Tai, C. T. (1948). "On the theory of biconical antennas". Journal of Applied Physics. 19: 1155–1160. doi:10.1063/1.1715036.
- Tai, Chen-To (1958). "Maxwell fish-eye treated by Maxwell equations". Nature. 182: 1600–1601. doi:10.1038/1821600b0.
- Tai, C. T. (1964). "A study of electrodynamics of moving media". Proceedings of the IEEE. 52 (6): 685–689. doi:10.1109/PROC.1964.3050.
- Tai, Chen-To (1972). "Kirchhoff theory: Scalar, vector, or dyadic?". IEEE Transactions on Antennas and Propagation. 20 (1): 114–115. doi:10.1109/tap.1972.1140146.
- Tai, C. T. (1973). "On the eigenfunction expansion of dyadic Green's functions". Proceedings of the IEEE. 61 (4): 480–481. doi:10.1109/PROC.1973.9075.
- Tai, Chen-To; Rozenfeld, P. (1976). "Different representations of dyadic Green's functions for a rectangular cavity". IEEE Transactions on Microwave Theory and Techniques. 24 (9): 597–601. doi:10.1109/TMTT.1976.1128914.
- Rashed, J.; Tai, C.-T. (1991). "A new class of resonant antennas". IEEE Transactions on Antennas and Propagation. 39 (9): 1428–1430. doi:10.1109/8.99054.
- Tai, C. T.; Collin, R. E. (2000). "Radiation of a Hertzian dipole immersed in a dissipative medium". IEEE Transactions on Antennas and Propagation. 48 (10): 1501–1506. doi:10.1109/8.899665.
