= Charles H. Papas =

American applied physicist and electrical engineer (1918–2007)

Charles Herach Papas
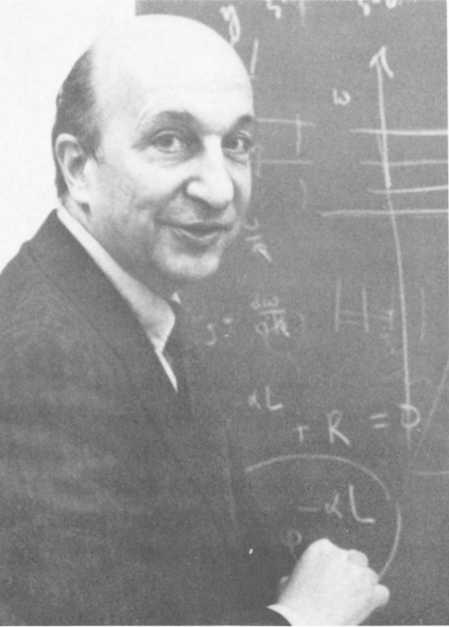
- Papas in an undated photo
- Born: March 29, 1918; Troy, NY, United States
- Died: 2007 (aged 88–89)
- Education: Massachusetts Institute of Technology; Harvard University
- Known for: Notable contributions in electromagnetic theory and radiophysics
- Scientific career
- Fields: Physics; Electrical engineering
- Workplaces: California Institute of Technology
- Thesis: A Theoretical Investigation of Spherically-Capped Conical Antennas (1948)
- Doctoral advisor: Ronold W. P. King
- Doctoral students: Carl Edward Baum; Charles Elachi; Nader Engheta; Jerry Harris; Japie van Zyl

Charles Herach Papas (March 29, 1918 – July 8, 2007) was an American applied physicist and electrical engineer, known for his contributions to electromagnetic theory, microwaves, radiophysics, gravitational electromagnetics, astrophysics, guided waves, and remote sensing. He was a professor at the Department of Electrical Engineering at California Institute of Technology.

His book Theory of Electromagnetic Wave Propagation is a recognized classic on electromagnetic theory.

== Background ==
Charles Herach Papas was born on March 29, 1918, in Troy, New York. Following his family, which was involved in the import/export trade, he spent his early childhood in Tianjin, China. After returning to the United States and completing high school, he matriculated at the Massachusetts Institute of Technology where he received a B.S. in electrical engineering in 1941. He completed his graduate studies at Harvard University, where he obtained an M.S. in communications engineering in 1946 and a PhD in electrodynamics in 1948, with a dissertation titled A Theoretical Investigation of Spherically-Capped Conical Antennas advised by Ronold W. P. King.

During the war years (1941-1945) he was with the Navy Department, Washington, DC, working at the Naval Ordnance Laboratory on the degaussing problem and at the Bureau of Ships working on microwave radar antennas. After receiving the Ph.D. degree, he remained at Harvard University as a Research Fellow to work with Professor Ronold W. P. King and Professor Léon Brillouin on antenna and scattering problems. From 1950 to 1952 he was with the University of California as a Staff Member of the Los Alamos Scientific Laboratory, as a Consultant to the Radiation Laboratory at the University of California, Berkeley, and as lecturer in the Electrical Engineering Department, Berkeley. At the Radiation Laboratory he assisted Professor Luis Alvarez in the design of a linear accelerator, and at Los Alamos he worked with Professor Enrico Fermi on the theory of radioflash (now known as EMP). In 1952 Papas accepted a faculty position at the California Institute of Technology where he continued his teaching and research activities for 36 years, and was Director of the Antenna Laboratory. After retiring in 1989, he was Emeritus Professor of Electrical Engineering.

As a result of his pioneering work in radiophysics and the electrodynamics of flare stars, Papas was honored with election to the Armenian National Academy of Sciences and the Academy of Sciences of the Institute of Bologna.

== Books ==
- Theory of Electromagnetic Wave Propagation (McGraw-Hill, 1965; reprinted by Dover Publications, 2011).
- Lectures on Electromagnetic Theory (Academy of Sciences, Yerevan, Armenia, 1973).
- Electromagnetic Waveguides and Resonators, in Handbuch der Physik, vol. XVI, (Springer-Verlag, 1958). With Fritz Borgnis
- Randwertprobleme der Mikrowellenphysik (Springer-Verlag, 1955). With Fritz Borgnis

== Awards ==
- foreign member of the Academy of Sciences, Bologna, Italy
- foreign member of the Academy of Sciences, Yerevan, Armenia
