= Carl Edward Baum =

American electrical engineer and pulsed power researcher

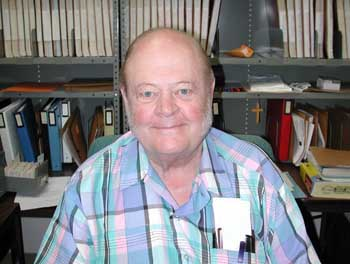
- Baum c. 2006
- Born: February 6, 1940; Binghamton, New York, U.S.
- Died: December 2, 2010 (aged 70); Albuquerque, New Mexico, U.S.
- Education: California Institute of Technology
- Known for: Electromagnetic pulse; High-power microwaves
- Awards: Harold Brown Award (1990); John Kraus Antenna Award (2006); IEEE Electromagnetics Award (2007)
- Scientific career
- Fields: Electrical engineering
- Workplaces: Air Force Research Laboratory; University of New Mexico
- Thesis: A Scaling Technique for the Design of Idealized Electromagnetic Lenses (1969)
- Doctoral advisor: Charles H. Papas
- Website: summa.unm.edu/notes/

Carl Edward Baum (February 6, 1940 — December 2, 2010) was an American electrical engineer, who is best known for his contributions to the studies in electromagnetic pulses, pulsed power, high-power microwaves, and transient electromagnetics. Having been affiliated with the Directed Energy Directorate of Air Force Research Laboratory for the most of his career, he was a professor at the Department of Electrical and Computer Engineering at University of New Mexico from 2005 until his death.

== Biography ==
Carl Edward Baum was born on February 6, 1940 in Binghamton, New York. His father was a construction engineer at Carrier Global, and he spent his childhood in Atlanta, Syracuse, and Rochester. He completed his high school education at Christian Brothers Academy in Syracuse, and was subsequently admitted to California Institute of Technology, where he played college football in addition to his studies. He received his bachelor's, master's, and PhD degrees in electrical engineering from Caltech in 1962, 1963, and 1969, respectively. He was advised by Charles H. Papas during his doctoral studies. Following his undergraduate degree, he joined the United States Air Force, being stationed at the Air Force Research Laboratory at Kirtland Air Force Base from 1963 until 1971 as an officer. After his tenure as a military officer, he became a civilian research scientist at the institution, where he resumed his work until his retirement as a senior research engineer in 2005. Following his retirement from the Air Force Research Laboratory, he joined the Department of Electrical and Computer Engineering at the University of New Mexico.

From 1960s until his death, he was the editor of the Notes series, which featured technical contributions and reports on electromagnetics and high-power microwaves from various collaborators. In 1984, he established SUMMA Foundation, a nonprofit organization that awards grants to young scientists in the field of electromagnetics, as well as sponsoring short courses, symposia, and the book publications. Becoming an IEEE fellow in 1984, Baum was also the member of Commissions A, B and E of the U.S. National Committee of the International Union of Radio Science. He was also a Distinguished Lecturer for the IEEE Antennas and Propagation Society, and has led short courses and workshops on high-power electromagnetics in numerous countries during his career. In 2004, he was awarded an Honorary Doctorate of Engineering from Otto von Guericke University Magdeburg. In 2006, he received the John Kraus Antenna Award from the IEEE Antennas and Propagation Society for "the development of novel and innovative ultra-wideband antenna concepts." In 2007, he received the IEEE Electromagnetics Award for "contributions to fundamental principles and techniques in electromagnetics."

Among his colleagues, Baum was also known for his interest in music: having studied piano and baritone horn as a youth, he continued playing the piano and creating his own musical compositions during his adult life. He was a practising Roman Catholic, and acted as the choir director of his church in Albuquerque, New Mexico. He died on December 2, 2010 in Albuquerque, due to complications from a stroke.

== Research ==
Baum is known for his contribution to theory, applications, and testing of electromagnetic pulses (EMP) and high-power microwaves (HPM), authoring numerous journal articles, technical notes, and books on these subjects. His theoretical contributions include singularity and eigenmode expansion methods for transient electromagnetics, and analysis of parallel-plate and multi-conductor transmission lines: Baum–Liu–Tesche (BLT) equation, widely used in the characterization of junctions in multi-conductor transmission lines, is named after him. His research also involved the design of various nuclear EMP sensors and simulators for the military such as ATLAS-I; Weapons Effects Buoy System, in particular, was deployed and tested in the Bahamas in the 1960s. His other research interests included electromagnetic topology, ultra-wideband antennas, HPEM systems, and lightnings.

== Selected publications ==
Books

- Baum, C. E.; Stone, A. P. (1990). Transient Lens Synthesis: Differential Geometry in Electromagnetic Theory. CRC Press.
- Baum, Carl E. (1998). Detection and Identification of Visually Obscured Targets. Routledge.

Book chapters

- Baum, C. E. (1976). "The Singularity Expansion Method". In Felsen, Leopold B. (ed.). Transient Electromagnetic Fields. Springer-Verlag. ISBN 978-3-662-30907-0.

Journal articles

- Baum, C. E. (November 1976). "Emerging technology for transient and broad-band analysis and synthesis of antennas and scatterers". Proceedings of the IEEE. 64 (11): 1598–1616. doi:10.1109/PROC.1976.10379.
- Baum, C. (January 1978). "EMP simulators for various types of nuclear EMP environments: An interim categorization". IEEE Transactions on Antennas and Propagation. 26 (1): 35–53. Bibcode:1978ITAP...26...35B. doi:10.1109/TAP.1978.1141794.
- Baum, C. E.; Rothwell, E. J.; Chen, K. -M.; Nyquist, D. P. (October 1991). "The singularity expansion method and its application to target identification". Proceedings of the IEEE. 79 (10): 1481–1492. doi:10.1109/5.104223.
- Baum, C. E. (June 1992). "From the electromagnetic pulse to high-power electromagnetics". Proceedings of the IEEE. 80 (6): 789–817. doi:10.1109/5.149443.
