= Engelbert Arnold =

Swiss electrical engineer (1856–1911)

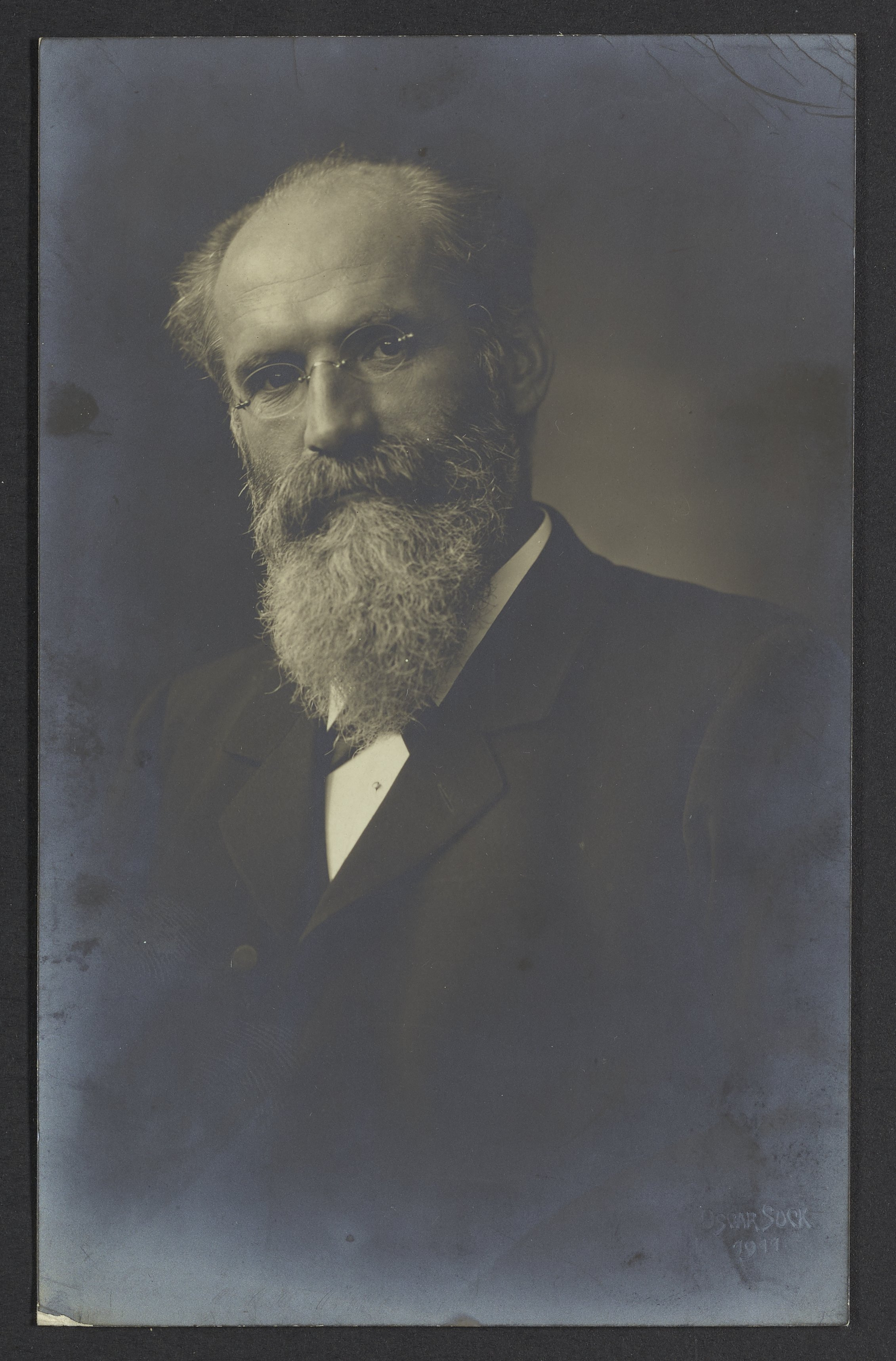
- Born: March 7, 1856; Schlierbach, Switzerland
- Died: November 16, 1911 (aged 55); Karlsruhe, German Empire
- Education: ETH Zurich
- Scientific career
- Workplaces: Technical University of Riga; Oerlikon; Karlsruhe Institute of Technology
- Doctoral students: Winfried Otto Schumann

Engelbert Arnold (7 March 1856 – 16 November 1911) was a Swiss-born electrical engineer. He was the first professor of the electrotechnical institute at the University of Karlsruhe (TH), which was founded under his supervision from 1896 until 1898.

== Biography ==
On 7 March 1856 Engelbert Arnold was born in Schlierbach (Swiss) as one of nine children. His father was a farmer. Arnold went to the Gymnasium in Beromünster, before he studied mechanical engineering at the ETH Zurich between 1874 and 1878. After several internships in Leipzig and Offenbach he became an assistant of Carl Ludwig Moll at the Technical University of Riga. He habilitated in 1883 and worked as a Privatdozent for mechanical and electrical engineering. In 1888 Arnold founded together with Heinrich Dettmann the Russian-baltic electrotechnical factory (german “Russisch-baltische Elektrotechnische Fabrik”) to build electric generators. In 1886 he published his book „Die Ankerwicklungen und Ankerkonstruktionen der Gleichstrom-Dynamomaschinen“ about electrical motors and generators (with focus on armature windings and the construction of armatures). Afterwards, in 1891, he replaced Charles Eugene Lancelot Brown as leading electrical engineer at Oerlikon. There he focused on the analysis and improvement of repulsion motors.

1892 Arnold got married with Helen Moll, daughter of his former professor Carl Ludwig Moll. They had a daughter together, who was born in 1899. In 1894, he was announced professor at the University of Karlsruhe (TH). Between 1899 and 1904 he built the first electrotechnical laboratory. In cooperation with his assistant Jens Lassen La Cour, he published his book on alternating current machines (german „Die Wechselstromtechnik“), which includes five volumes.

In 1905 he was appointed Geheimer Hofrat and he received the honorary doctor degree from Leibniz University Hannover. In 1906/1907 Arnold was rector of the University of Karlsruhe (TH). Before Arnold died on 16 November 1911, he offered a professorship to Rudolf Richter, who took Arnolds place as head of the electrotechnical institute in 1912.

== Publications ==
- Die Ankerwicklungen der Gleichstrom-Dynamomaschinen : Entwicklung und Anwendung einer allgemein gültigen Schaltungsregel, 1891. PPN: 038578409.
- Die Ankerwicklungen und Ankerkonstruktionen der Gleichstrom-Dynamomaschinen, 1896. PPN: 084033991.
- with La Cour, J.L. Die Gleichstrommaschine: Theorie, Konstruktion, Berechnung, Untersuchung u. Arbeitsweise derselben, 1903. 2 Bände, PPN: 011375566.
- Engelbert Arnold (Hrsg.) Die Wechselstromtechnik. 5 Bände, PPN: 011367415.
- with La Cour, J.L. Die Kommutation bei Gleichstrom- und Wechselstrom-Kommutatormaschinen, 1906 (Sammlung elektrotechnischer Vorträge Band 9). PPN: 096728957.
