= Anne Schilling =

American mathematician

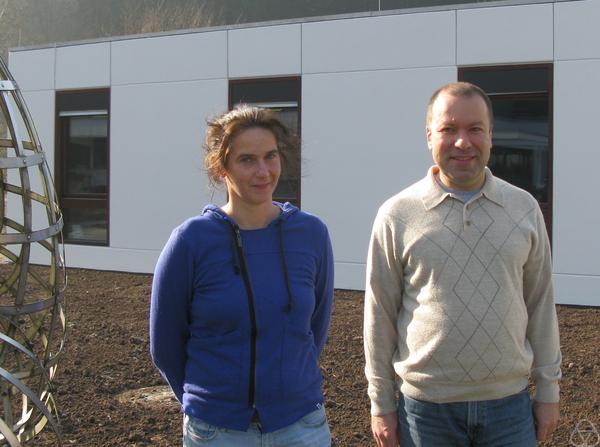
Anne Schilling with Cristian Lenart at the MFO, 2011

Anne Schilling is a German/American mathematician specializing in algebraic combinatorics, representation theory, and mathematical physics. She is a professor of mathematics at the University of California, Davis.

== Education ==
Schilling completed her Ph.D. in 1997 at Stony Brook University. Her dissertation, Bose-Fermi Identities and Bailey Flows in Statistical Mechanics and Conformal Field Theory, was supervised by Barry M. McCoy. From 1997 until 1999, she was a postdoctoral fellow at the Institute for Theoretical Physics at Amsterdam University and from 1999 until 2001, she was a C.L.E. Moore Instructor at the Mathematics Department at M.I.T.. After that she joined the faculty at the Department of Mathematics at UC Davis.

== Books ==
With Thomas Lam, Luc Lapointe, Jennifer Morse, Mark Shimozono, and Mike Zabrocki, Schilling is the author of the research monograph $k$-Schur Functions and Affine Schubert Calculus (Fields Institute Monographs 33, Springer, 2014).

With Isaiah Lankham and Bruno Nachtergaele, Schilling is the author of the textbook on linear algebra, Linear Algebra as an Introduction to Abstract Mathematics (World Scientific, 2016).

With Daniel Bump, she is the author of a more advanced book on crystal bases in representation theory, Crystal Bases: Representations and Combinatorics (World Scientific, 2017).

== Recognition ==
Schilling was a Fulbright Scholar from 1992-1993 as a doctoral student. In 2002 she received a Humboldt Research Fellowship. She was awarded a Simons Fellowship for the academic year 2012–2013. She was included in the 2019 class of fellows of the American Mathematical Society "for contributions to algebraic combinatorics, combinatorial representation theory, and mathematical physics and for service to the profession". Schilling was selected as the 43rd Emmy Noether Lecturer at the Joint Mathematics Meetings in San Francisco on January 3–6, 2024.
