= Schwinger parametrization =

Loop integral parametrization

Schwinger parametrization is a technique for evaluating loop integrals which arise from Feynman diagrams with one or more loops. It is named after Julian Schwinger, who introduced the method in 1951 for quantum electrodynamics.

== Description ==
Using the observation that

$$\frac{1}{A^n}=\frac{1}{(n-1)!}\int^\infty_0 du \, u^{n-1}e^{-uA},$$

one may simplify the integral:

$$\int \frac{dp}{A(p)^n}=\frac{1}{\Gamma(n)}\int dp \int^\infty_0 du \, u^{n-1}e^{-uA(p)}=\frac{1}{\Gamma(n)}\int^\infty_0 du \, u^{n-1} \int dp \, e^{-uA(p)},$$

for $\mathrm{Re}(n)>0$.

=== Alternative parametrization ===
Another version of Schwinger parametrization is:

$$\frac{i}{A+i\epsilon}=\int^\infty_0 du \, e^{iu(A+i\epsilon)},$$

which is convergent as long as $\epsilon >0$ and $A \in \mathbb R$. It is easy to generalize this identity to n denominators.

== See also ==
- Feynman parametrization
