= Jerry Harris (scientist) =

American geophysicist

- Born: Mississippi
- Education: University of Mississippi, California Institute of Technology
- Occupation: Academic; university teacher; geophysicist
- Awards: Packard Fellowship for Science and Engineering (1989)
- Website: profiles.stanford.edu/jerry-harris
- Academic career
- Fields: Geophysics
- Institutions: Stanford University (1988–)
- Thesis: The Influence of Random Media on the Propagation and Depolarization of Electromagnetic Waves
- Doctoral advisor: Charles H. Papas

Jerry M. Harris is an American geophysicist and the Cecil and Ida Green Professor of Geophysics at Stanford University. Harris established the Stanford Wave Physics Lab, which investigates the physics of seismic and electromagnetic waves in complex media. He was co-founder of the Stanford Global Climate and Energy Project and the Center for Computational Earth and Environmental Science.

== Early life and education ==
Harris was born and raised in Mississippi. He was at school for the end of segregation, and eventually studied electrical engineering at the University of Mississippi. He earned his undergraduate degree in 1973, and moved to the California Institute of Technology (Caltech) for his graduate work. Harris eventually earned his master's and doctoral degrees at Caltech. During his doctoral research, Harris became conscious that he was the only African-American student. After earning his doctorate, Harris worked in both the communications and petroleum industries. This included three years at COMSAT, followed by four years at both Exxon and Standard Oil of Ohio (SOHIO).

== Research and career ==
In 1988 Harris joined Stanford University, where he established the Stanford Wave Physics Lab. The Stanford Wave Physics Lab investigate the physics of seismic and electromagnetic waves in complex media. During his tenure at Stanford Harris served as Chair of the Department of Geophysics. In 2006 he founded the Center for Computational Earth and Environmental Science, a research partnership between the Stanford School of Earth Sciences and Computer Science Laboratory. He was named the Cecil and Ida Green Professor at Stanford University in 2008.

Harris primarily specialised in Crosswell seismic imaging; which can be used to produce high-resolution large scale images, an order of magnitude better than those produced by conventional seismic surveys. Images with such extraordinary resolution are important for reservoir management. Harris developed the sources for Crosswell data acquisition, including piezoelectric sources and low frequency pneumatic vibrators. Beyond Crosswell imaging, Harris studied the surface attenuation of seismic waves. To do this, Harris developed acoustic resonance spectroscopy, which could measure the Q factors of small sample rocks in the laboratory.

=== Academic service ===
Harris dedicated his career to improving diversity within geoscience research and industry. In 2000 he founded the Summer Undergraduate Research in Geoscience and Engineering (SURGE) programme, which supports minority students who are considering careers in the earth sciences. Over ninety percent of SURGE graduates went on to have careers in the earth sciences. In 2014 he partnered with the University of California, Berkeley, University of California, Los Angeles and Caltech to launch the California Alliance for Graduate Education and the Professoriate; a consortium that looks to recruit more minority graduate students and faculty members. In 2015 Harris founded, and was subsequently made Associate Dean for the Office of Multicultural Affairs.

== Awards and honours ==
- 1979 Hughes Aircraft Company Graduate Fellow
- 1989 David and Lucile Packard Foundation Fellow
- 1995 Society of Petroleum Engineers Distinguished Lecturer
- 2002 Society of Exploration Geophysicists Distinguished Lecturer
- 2015 Stanford University President's Award for Excellence Through Diversity

== Select publications ==
- Pride, S. R.; Berryman, J. G.; Harris, J. M. (January 2004). "Seismic attenuation due to wave-induced flow". Journal of Geophysical Research. 109 (B1). Bibcode:2004JGRB..109.1201P. doi:10.1029/2003JB002639. ISSN 0148-0227. Wikidata Q105360584.
- Quan, Youli; Harris, Jerry M. (May 1997). "Seismic attenuation tomography using the frequency shift method". Geophysics. 62 (3): 895–905. Bibcode:1997Geop...62..895Q. doi:10.1190/1.1444197. ISSN 0016-8033. Wikidata Q105360586.
- Li, Dongzhuo; Harris, Jerry M (14 September 2018). "Full waveform inversion with nonlocal similarity and model-derivative domain adaptive sparsity-promoting regularization". Geophysical Journal International. 215 (3): 1841–1864. arXiv:1803.11391. Bibcode:2018GeoJI.215.1841L. doi:10.1093/GJI/GGY380. ISSN 0956-540X. Wikidata Q105361715.
