= Kun-Mu Chen =

Taiwanese-American electrical engineer

- Born: February 3, 1933; Taipei, Taiwan
- Died: December 15, 2022 (aged 89); San Diego, California, U.S.
- Education: National Taiwan University; Harvard University
- Known for: Microwave life-detection systems
- Awards: IEEE Life Fellow; AAAS Fellow; Richard M. Hong Endowed Chair
- Scientific career
- Fields: Electrical engineering
- Workplaces: Michigan State University; University of Michigan
- Thesis: Antennas Coupled to Open Wire Lines (1960)
- Doctoral advisor: Ronold W. P. King
- Doctoral students: Dennis P. Nyquist

Kun-Mu Chen (Chinese: 陳坤木; February 3, 1933 – December 15, 2022) was a Taiwanese-American electrical engineer, who was a professor emeritus at Michigan State University. He is best known for his contributions to the development of the microwave life-detection systems for urban search and rescue operations.

== Life and career ==
Chen was born in Taipei, Taiwan, on February 3, 1933. He graduated as a valedictorian in electrical engineering from National Taiwan University. Upon graduation, he was selected as one of two winners of the C.T. Loo Fellowship, which funded his graduate studies at Harvard University under the mentorship of Ronold W. P. King. He earned his Master of Science in 1958 and PhD in applied physics in 1960; his doctoral dissertation was titled "Antennas Coupled to Open Wire Lines."

From 1960 to 1964, Chen worked as a research associate at the Radiation Laboratory at the University of Michigan following an invitation by Kip Siegel, conducting research in electromagnetics and plasma physics. In 1964, he joined Michigan State University as an associate professor of electrical engineering and was promoted to a full professor in 1967. His research interests gravitated towards bioelectromagnetics later during his career; his work led to the development of the microwave life-detection system, which was used by NASA in urban search and rescue operations following earthquakes. He retired in 2000 as the Richard M. Hong Professor Emeritus. Following his retirement, he moved to San Diego, California, where he died on December 15, 2022.

Chen was a Life Fellow of the Institute of Electrical and Electronics Engineers (IEEE) and a Fellow of the American Association for the Advancement of Science (AAAS). In 1995, the Richard M. Hong Endowed Chair in Electrical Engineering was established by alumnus Richard M. Hong to honor Chen.

== Selected publications ==
Journal articles

- Livesay, D. E.; Chen, K. (December 1974). "Electromagnetic fields induced inside arbitrarily shaped biological bodies". IEEE Transactions on Microwave Theory and Techniques. 22 (12): 1273–1280. doi:10.1109/TMTT.1974.1128475.
- Chen, Kun-Mu; Misra, Devendra; Wang, Huei; Chuang, Huey-Ru; Postow, Elliot (July 1986). "An X-band microwave life-detection system". IEEE Transactions on Biomedical Engineering. BME-33 (7): 697–701. doi:10.1109/TBME.1986.325760.
- Chuang, Huey-Ru; Chen, Y. F.; Chen, Kun-Mu (August 1991). "Automatic clutter-canceler for microwave life-detection systems". IEEE Transactions on Instrumentation and Measurement. 40 (4): 747–750. doi:10.1109/19.85346.
- Li, Ching-Lei; Chen, Kun-Mu (February 1995). "Determination of electromagnetic properties of materials using flanged open-ended coaxial probe-full-wave analysis". IEEE Transactions on Instrumentation and Measurement. 44 (1): 19–27. doi:10.1109/19.368108.
- Chen, Kun-Mu; Huang, Yong; Zhang, Jianping; Norman, A. (January 2000). "Microwave life-detection systems for searching human subjects under earthquake rubble or behind barrier". IEEE Transactions on Biomedical Engineering. 47 (1): 105–114. doi:10.1109/10.817625.

Books

- Chen, K.-M. (2008). Special Topics in Electromagnetics. National Taiwan University Press.

== Awards and honors ==
- Life Fellow, Institute of Electrical and Electronics Engineers
- Fellow, American Association for the Advancement of Science (1977)
- Richard M. Hong Endowed Chair, Michigan State University (1995)
