= Wu–Yang monopole =

Type of Yang–Mills theory magnetic monopole

The Wu–Yang monopole was the first solution (found in 1968 by Tai Tsun Wu and Chen Ning Yang) to the Yang–Mills field equations. It describes a magnetic monopole which is pointlike and has a potential which behaves like 1/r everywhere.

== See also ==
- Meron
- Dyon
- Instanton
- Wu–Yang dictionary
