= Rinat Kedem =

American mathematician

Rinat Kedem in 2001.

Rinat Kedem (born 5 December 1965) is an American mathematician and mathematical physicist.

Kedem graduated in 1988 with BA in physics from Macalester College. She received her PhD in physics in 1993 from Stony Brook University (the State University of New York at Stony Brook) with thesis advisor Barry M. McCoy. She was a postdoc from 1993 to 1995 at Kyoto University's Research Institute for Mathematical Sciences (RIMS), from 1995 to 1996 at the University of Melbourne, and from 1996 to 1997 at the University of California, Berkeley. At the University of Massachusetts Amherst, she was an assistant professor of mathematics from 1997 to 2001. In the mathematics department of the University of Illinois at Urbana-Champaign, she was from 2001 to 2006 an assistant professor and from 2006 to 2012 an associate professor and is since 2012 a full professor.

Kedem's research deals with mathematical physics, Lie algebras, integrable models, and cluster algebras. In 2014 she was an invited speaker with talk Fermionic spectra in integrable systems at the International Congress of Mathematicians in Seoul. She was a plenary speaker in 2012 at the 24th International Conference on Formal Power Series and Algebraic Combinatorics in Nagoya and in 2019 at the 11th International Symposium on Quantum Theory and Symmetries (QTS2019) in Montreal. For the academic year 2019–2020 she was awarded a Simons Fellowship.

== Selected publications ==
- Kedem, R.; Klassen, T.R.; McCoy, B.M.; Melzer, E. (1993). "Fermionic quasi-particle representations for characters of (($G$^{(1)})_{1}$\times$($G$^{(1)})_{1})/($G$^{(1)})_{2}". Physics Letters B. 304 (3–4): 263–270. arXiv:hep-th/9211102. doi:10.1016/0370-2693(93)90292-P. S2CID 2243256.
- Kedem, R.; Klassen, T.R.; McCoy, B.M.; Melzer, E. (1993). "Fermionic sum representations for conformal field theory characters". Physics Letters B. 307 (1–2): 68–76. arXiv:hep-th/9301046. Bibcode:1993PhLB..307...68K. doi:10.1016/0370-2693(93)90194-M. S2CID 99529.
- Jimbo, Michio; Kedem, Rinat; Kojima, Takeo; Konno, Hitoshi; Miwa, Tetsuji (1995). "XXZ chain with a boundary". Nuclear Physics B. 441 (3): 437–470. arXiv:hep-th/9411112. Bibcode:1995NuPhB.441..437J. doi:10.1016/0550-3213(95)00062-W. S2CID 118907908.
- Jimbo, Michio; Kedem, Rinat; Konno, Hitoshi; Miwa, Tetsuji; Weston, Robert (1995). "Difference equations in spin chains with a boundary". Nuclear Physics B. 448 (3): 429–456. arXiv:hep-th/9502060. Bibcode:1995NuPhB.448..429J. doi:10.1016/0550-3213(95)00218-H. S2CID 2947742.
- Kedem, Rinat (2008). "Q-systems as cluster algebras". Journal of Physics A: Mathematical and Theoretical. 41 (19) 194011. arXiv:0712.2695. Bibcode:2008JPhA...41s4011K. doi:10.1088/1751-8113/41/19/194011. S2CID 115158426.
- Di Francesco, Philippe; Kedem, Rinat (2009). "Q-systems as Cluster Algebras II: Cartan Matrix of Finite Type and the Polynomial Property". Letters in Mathematical Physics. 89 (3): 183–216. arXiv:0803.0362. Bibcode:2009LMaPh..89..183D. doi:10.1007/s11005-009-0354-z. S2CID 16365405.
- Di Francesco, Philippe; Kedem, Rinat (2010). "Q-Systems, Heaps, Paths and Cluster Positivity". Communications in Mathematical Physics. 293 (3): 727–802. arXiv:0811.3027. Bibcode:2010CMaPh.293..727F. doi:10.1007/s00220-009-0947-5. S2CID 115154922.
