= Nanjing Never Cries =

Novel by Hong Zheng

- First edition (publ. Killian Press)
- Author: Hong Zheng
- Publisher: Killian Press
- Publication date: September 7, 2016
- ISBN: 978-1-944347-00-0

Nanjing Never Cries is a 2016 novel by American writer Hong Zheng about the Nanjing Massacre.

== Story and contents ==
The main character is May Chen, an 18-year-old girl, who is an acquaintance of Calvin Ren. Calvin is a native of Nanjing, and a Nanjing Central University engineer. Calvin is accompanied by John Winthrop, who is working with Calvin on a military aviation program of the Republic of China government. John had previously studied with Calvin in Cambridge, Massachusetts and John himself is from Massachusetts and has a woman stateside he plans to marry. May seeks safety with John as the Nanjing Massacre occurs, resulting in the deaths of almost all of the members of her family. May, after the end of the Second Sino-Japanese War and World War II, decides to ensure that the Nanjing community is redressed, while John returns to the United States. Kirkus states in regards to May and John, the latter teaching English to May, "Their relationship never moves beyond friendship and a few kisses".

Chiang Kai-Shek, Soong May-ling, and Minnie Vautrin appear in the story.

The book includes an appendix.

== Background ==
Cheng, who works at Massachusetts Institute of Technology (MIT) as a professor, stated that some coworkers suggested he attend an event called "The Atomic Bombs: Myth, Memory and History," a symposium held on April 13, 1995, stating that it was not accurately presenting World War II, and Cheng, after attending, believed that the symposium wrongly vilified the United States for using nuclear weapons on Japan. Cheng interviewed two people who had experienced the events and had done additional research.

Cheng decided to write this book to educate readers about the Nanjing Massacre.

Cheng stated he chose to write a novel instead of a work of non-fiction because readers would focus on humanistic elements and "People will see the inner world of the Nanjing people living under the massacre."

== Reception ==
Kirkus Reviews praises the research used to build the book and stated it was "capably written" and that it establishes "a vivid portrait of 1930s urban China". Kirkus argues at times the storyline is "too sprawling".

Zhu Dongyang and Guo Yina of Xinhua wrote that the "Gripping and disturbing" work has "a compelling story".

Cang Wei of China Daily wrote that Nanjing Never Cries was "praised by researchers of the Nanjing Massacre."
