= Barry M. McCoy =

American physicist

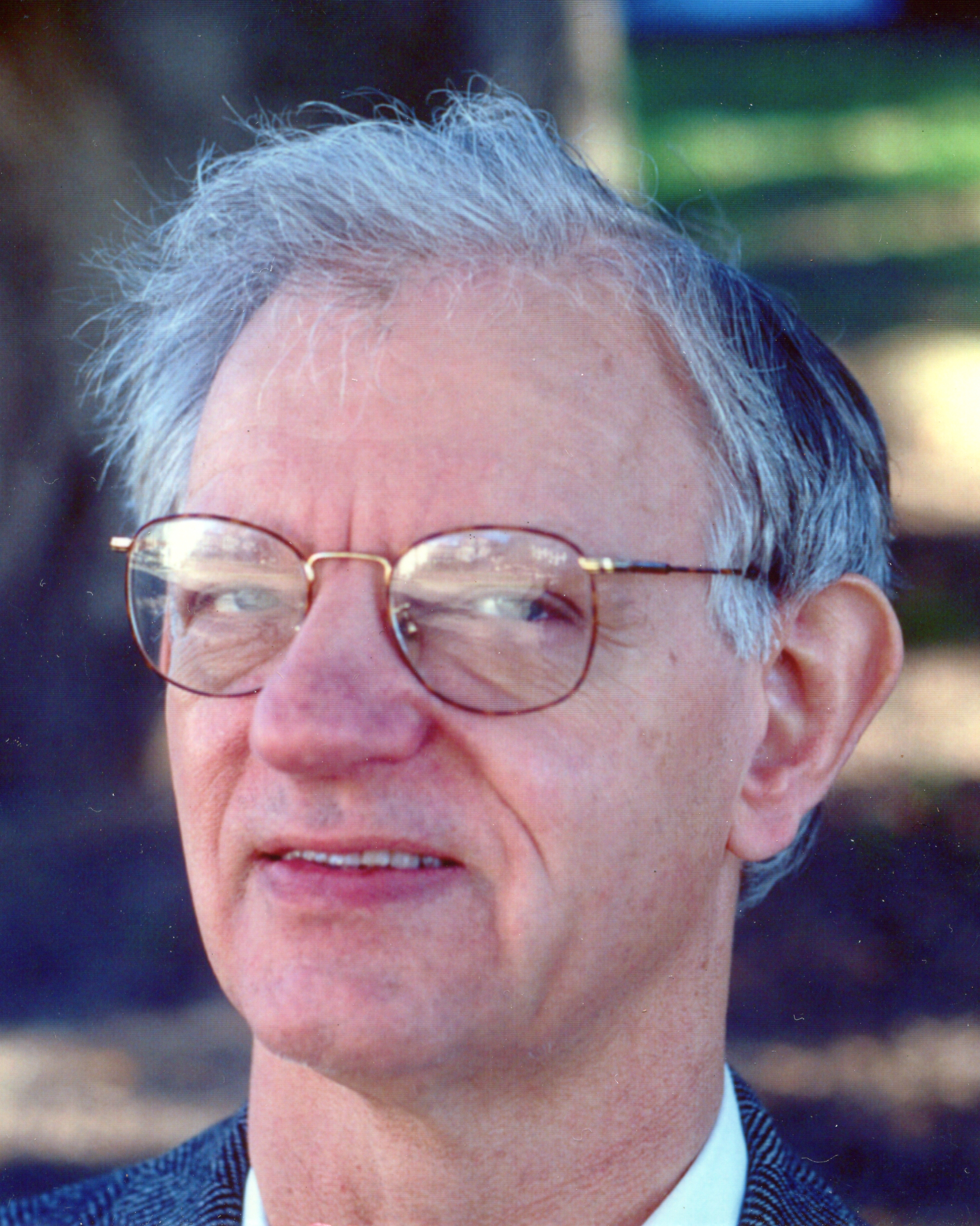
McCoy in 2002

Barry Malcolm McCoy (born 14 December 1940 in Trenton, New Jersey) is an American physicist, known for his contributions to classical statistical mechanics, integrable models, and conformal field theories.

He earned a B.Sc. from California Institute of Technology (1963), and a Ph.D. from Harvard University (1967) with the thesis Spin Correlations of the Two Dimensional Ising Model advised by Tai Tsun Wu. The two of them also wrote the book The Two Dimensional Ising Model (Harvard University Press, 1973).

He then joined the institute for theoretical physics at State University of New York at Stony Brook (1967), where he has been since, now as a distinguished professor. McCoy was a visiting scholar at the Research Institute for Mathematical Sciences in Kyoto several times (first in 1980), the Institute Henri Poincaré, and the Australian National University.

In 1998 McCoy, together with Alexander Berkovich, was an invited speaker of the International Congress of Mathematicians in Berlin. With colleagues Tai Tsun Wu and Alexander Zamolodchikov, he was awarded the Dannie Heineman Prize for Mathematical Physics 1999, for "his work on the statistical mechanics of the Ising model, including boundary critical phenomena, randomly layered systems which have Griffiths-McCoy singularities, the Painleve representation of the two point function, quadratic difference equations for the n-point functions, and the Ising model in a magnetic field. Dr. McCoy has in addition made contributions to the study of quantum spin chains, and the Fermionic representations of conformal field theory, and has been a co-discoverer of the integrable chiral Potts model. He has also worked extensively in quantum field theory and more recently has become known for his mathematical work in nonlinear differential equations and the theory of Rogers-Ramanujan identities".

His doctoral students include Rinat Kedem, Anne Schilling, and Craig Tracy.
