= Saturn Electrostatic Discharges =

Lightning events on Saturn

Saturn Electrostatic Discharges (also referred to as SEDs) are atmospheric lightning events in convective weather storms on Saturn that produce high frequency (HF) radio emissions (1–40 MHz). Terrestrial lighting events on Earth, in comparison, occur in the very low frequency (VLF) radio band, between 3 Hz and 30 kHz. This makes SED signals at least 10,000 times stronger. While first discovered by NASA's Voyager 1 mission, the scientific community has gained further understanding through the following Voyager 2 and Cassini missions in conjunction with ground-based observation and data gathering methods.

The charging of particles in thunderstorms on earth is most effective at 248 to 263 K. On Saturn this is at 8–10 bars or 200 km below the cloud tops. Both lighting on Earth and SEDs probably have a similar charging mechanism in water clouds around freezing level. Flashes on Saturn have a total energy of about 10^{12–13} Joules and typically last for 70 milliseconds. Strokes typically last for 100 microseconds on Saturn. Thunderstorms can last days or even months on Saturn, but storms can also be absent for years. One SED illuminates a cloud region about 200 km in diameter.

== Voyager ==
Saturn Electrostatic discharges were first recorded by the Voyager 1 spacecraft as it passed near Saturn in November 1980. The term was subsequently coined by Warwick et al. in April 1981 in the Journal Planetary Radio Astronomy Observations from Voyager 1 Near Saturn. It was initially uncertain whether these SEDs were associated with storms in the planet's atmosphere or if they were originating in its rings. Evans et al. hypothesized that they originated from a satellite located within Saturn's B Ring, which was also the proposed reason for a narrow feature also found. This was disputed in 1983 by Kaiser et al., who argued that the occultation caused by the planet lasted too long for SEDs to originate in the rings.

== Cassini ==
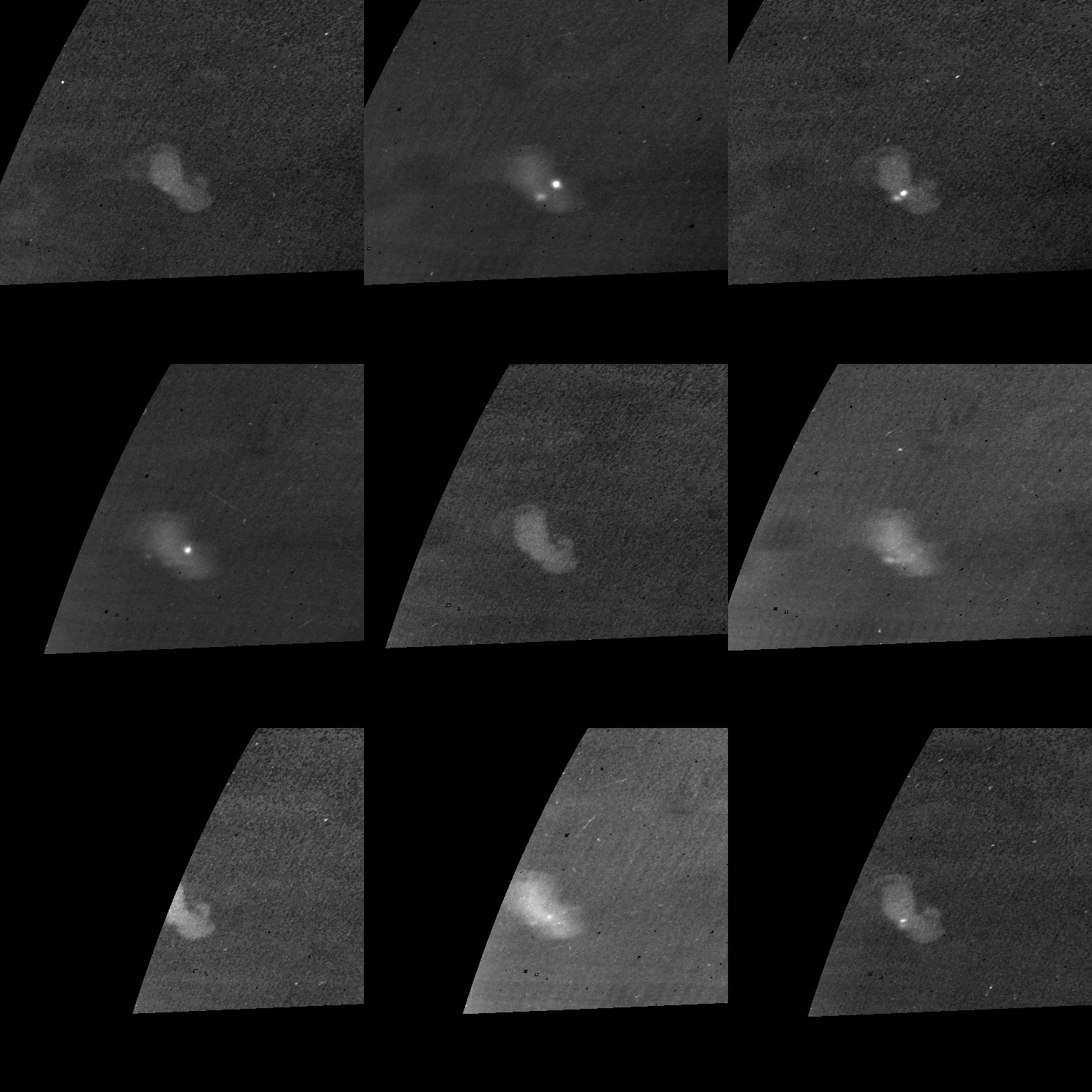
SEDs observed by Cassini in November 2009

When the Cassini orbiter reached Saturn in 2004, SEDs and optical storm observations were finally directly linked. This occurred when Cassini's ISS instrument imaged the Dragon Storm, which was located by the SEDs it produced and then optically verified. It and other white storm clouds were found to be brighter in conjunction with higher rates of SEDs. The Dragon Storm can range over 2,000 miles and is located at a planetocentric latitude of 35° south. This planet region is called "storm alley" as all storm activity on Saturn was concentrated here in a 1.5° band from 2002 to 2010. SED storms switched from the southern hemisphere "storm alley" before the equinox in August 2009 to the great white spot of 2010 in the northern hemisphere. The 2010 great white spot is associated with a higher flash rate of 10 SEDs per second.

During the Cassini mission, it was also discovered that SEDs could be detected over the horizon. This phenomenon, known as over-the-horizon events, was made possible by the previously mentioned combination of radio and optical observations. It is theorized that this occurs when SED radio waves are temporarily trapped under Saturn's ionosphere.

== Ground based observations ==
The first reliable ground-based detections of SEDs occurred in Ukraine in January/February 2006. At this time, SED storm E lasted approximately one month. The ground team used the UTR-2 radio telescope, and the data was combined with real-time information from Cassini. These efforts were made easier by the high intensity of the SEDs occurring during the month-long SED storm E. The process was repeated in November 2007 during the eight-month-long storm F and produced a high degree of coincidence between the UTR-2 and Cassini.

At this same time as storm E, amateur astronomers became engaged in observing Saturn's storms. Storm E, observed by Cassini, was the first long-lasting SED storm while Saturn was distant from solar conjunction, making it high in the sky for ground-based observers. In the images captured by amateurs, the SED storms proved easily detectable, manifesting as bright white spots.
