= Emil Schuhmann =

American accordionist and bandleader

- Born: January 1, 1856; Waldeck, Fayette, Texas, USA
- Died: April 15, 1937 (aged 81)

Emil Schuhmann (January 1, 1856 - April 15, 1937) was a Texas-born accordionist and bandleader who created the Pyramide toy. The elaborate toy, considered Texas folk art, was purchased in 1969 by Ima Hogg, daughter of Texas Gov. Jim Hogg, and put on display at Winedale Historical Complex near Round Top, Texas, where it remains to this day.

== Biography ==
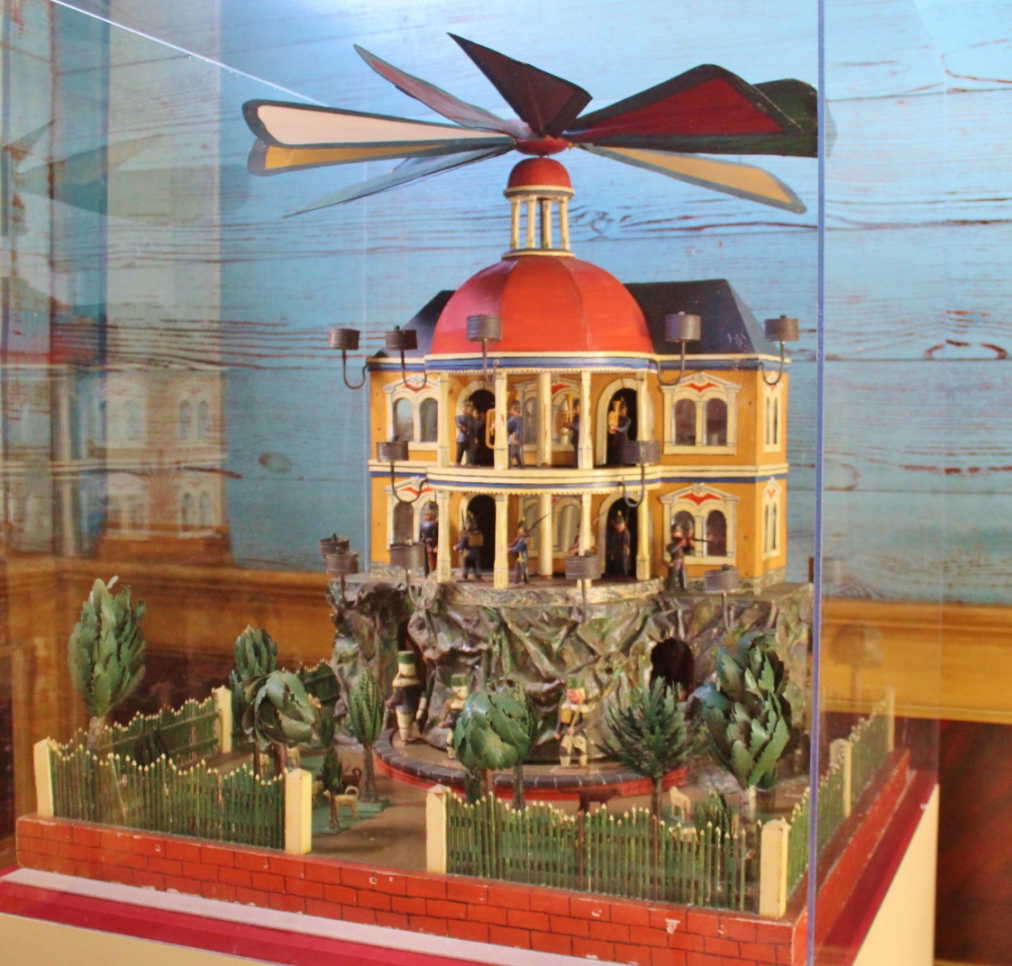
Emil Schuhmann's Pyramide is considered one of the finest pieces of Texas folk art.

Schuhmann was born in 1856 in the Waldeck community in Fayette County, Texas, to Carl Schuhmann and his wife, Christiana Friederike Wilhelmine Voigtel. The Schuhmanns immigrated to Texas in 1853 from Oberscheibe in Saxony, Germany. Oberscheibe was a mining community, and that detail as well as others about Emil's father's life, would make their way into Emil's Pyramide toy.

Schuhmann was one of four children. The oldest, Wilhelmine, was the only one to marry. Her first husband, Carl Kreidel, died in the Civil War. Her second husband was Eduard Wenzel. Emil and his younger sisters, Anna and Agnes, never married, choosing instead to remain on the family's Waldeck farm. Although Schuhmann lived on a farm, he devoted his life to music. He hired an African-American laborer named Lufkin Shelby to farm his land. After Schuhmann died, he left 50 acres (20 ha) of land to Shelby. Schulmann spent his time composing and teaching music. He was a member of the Schuhmann Band along with his cousins, Paul and Gus Schuhmann and other family members.

In the 1870s, Schuhmann began carving the Pyramide. He whittled all the pieces out of wood by hand with a pocket knife. The toy is about 3 feet (0.91 m) high and 2.5 feet (0.76 m) wide, with a domed building surrounded by a cupola. The building is supported by a papier mâché mountain. Three rotating circular platforms laden with carved figures are powered by the heat from thirteen oil lamps attached to the building and the mountain. The lower platform, which rotates inside the mountain itself, carries eight miniature miners, some pushing carts of ore and some carrying axes. The middle platform features soldiers carrying rifles with bayonets. The top platform features band members and a bandmaster. Other details include carved pine and palm trees and wooden figures in a fenced yard in front of the building - a soldier guarding at the gate; a shepherd with a flock of sheep; a hunter aiming his gun at a deer; three dogs and a leopard; and a squirrel looking down from a tree. The mountain is made from an 1872 German-language Galveston newspaper. Many of the scenes depict Carl Schuhmann's life back in Germany. Carl had served in the German Army and worked as a miner.

Schuhmann displayed his pyramid once a year during the Christmas holidays. He set it up in his living room, lit the lamps, and sat beside it playing Christmas carols on his concertina. As the little grease lamps burned, the heat would make the fan on top turn, and this moved the little wooden men in and out of the mine and the barracks.

After his death, the Pyramide was inherited by Schuhmann's nephew, Robert Wenzel. He kept it in the crate that Schuhmann built for it at his home in Seguin for more than 30 years. Wenzel died in 1969 and his widow, Annie, wrote Ima Hogg telling her about the pyramid. Hogg was the daughter of Gov. Jim Hogg. She was a well-known philanthropist and art collector. She was assembling a collection of Texas folk art for an exhibit at Winedale, the historic property near Round Top that she had given to the University of Texas at Austin in 1967. Hogg immediately went to Seguin, saw the Pyramide and purchased it for $500. The toy has been on exhibit at Winedale ever since. Historian Cecilia Steinfeldt, known as the first lady of Texas art, described it as “one of the finest pieces of folk art ever made in the Lone Star State.”
