= Winfried Otto Schumann =

German physicist and electrical engineer (1888–1974)

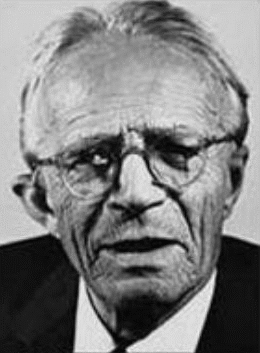
- Born: May 20, 1888; Tübingen, German Empire
- Died: September 22, 1974 (aged 86); Munich, West Germany
- Education: Karlsruhe Institute of Technology
- Known for: Schumann resonances
- Scientific career
- Workplaces: Brown, Boveri & Cie; University of Stuttgart; University of Jena; Wright-Patterson Air Force Base; Technical University of Munich
- Doctoral advisor: Engelbert Arnold
- Doctoral students: Fritz Borgnis

Winfried Otto Schumann (May 20, 1888 – September 22, 1974) was a German physicist and electrical engineer who predicted the Schumann resonances, a series of low-frequency resonances caused by lightning discharges in the atmosphere.

== Biography ==
Winfried Schumann was born in Tübingen, Germany, the son of a physical chemist. His early years were spent in Kassel and in Berndorf, a town near Vienna. He majored in electrical engineering at the Karlsruhe Institute of Technology. In 1912, he gained a doctorate with a thesis on high-voltage technology under the supervision of Engelbert Arnold. Prior to the First World War, he managed the high voltage laboratory at Brown, Boveri & Cie.

In 1920, he was made a professor at the Technical University in Stuttgart, where he had previously been employed as a research assistant. He subsequently took a position as professor of physics at the University of Jena. In 1924, he was made professor and director of the Electrophysical Laboratory at the Technical University of Munich.

He was brought to the United States under Operation Paperclip. During 1947–1948, he worked at the Wright-Patterson Air Force Base in Ohio, USA, and then returned to his post in Munich.

The Munich laboratory subsequently became the Electrophysical Institute, where Schumann continued working until retiring from active research in 1961 at the age of 73, though he continued teaching for a further two years.

== Patents ==
- U.S. patent 2,297,256, Tube control, Winfried Otto Schumann, Sep 29, 1942.
