= Feynman parametrization =

Parametrization used for loop integrals

Feynman parametrization is a technique for evaluating loop integrals which arise from Feynman diagrams with one or more loops. However, it is sometimes useful in integration in areas of pure mathematics as well. It was introduced by Julian Schwinger and Richard Feynman in 1949 to perform calculations in quantum electrodynamics. (Note: Schwinger is credited as having published first. Feynman credits the method "suggested by some work of Schwinger’s involving Gaussian integrals".)

Hung Cheng and T.T. Wu proved in 1987 that the sum in the Dirac delta function can be reduced to a subset of Feynman parameters. This result is known as Cheng–Wu theorem.

== Formulas ==
=== Two denominators ===
Richard Feynman observed that

$$\frac{1}{AB}=\int^1_0 \frac{du}{\left[uA +(1-u)B\right]^2}$$

which is valid for any complex numbers A and B as long as 0 is not contained in the line segment connecting A and B. The formula helps to evaluate integrals like:

$$\begin{align}
\int \frac{dp}{A(p)B(p)}
&= \int dp \int^1_0 \frac{du}{\left[uA(p)+(1-u)B(p)\right]^2} \\
&= \int^1_0 du \int \frac{dp}{\left[uA(p)+(1-u)B(p)\right]^2}.
\end{align}$$

If A(p) and B(p) are linear functions of p, then the last integral can be evaluated using substitution.

=== Multiple denominators ===
More generally, using the Dirac delta function $\delta$:

$$\begin{align}
\frac{1}{A_1\cdots A_n}&= (n-1)! \int^1_0 du_1 \cdots \int^1_0 du_n \frac{\delta(1-\sum_{k=1}^{n}u_{k})\;}{\left(\sum_{k=1}^{n}u_{k}A_{k}\right)^n} \\
&=(n-1)! \int^1_0 du_1 \int^{u_1}_0 du_2 \cdots \int^{u_{n-2}}_0 du_{n-1} \frac{1}{\left[A_1u_{n-1}+A_2(u_{n-2} - u_{n-1})+\dots+A_n(1 - u_1)\right]^n}.
\end{align}$$

This formula is valid for any complex numbers A_{1},...,A_{n} as long as 0 is not contained in their convex hull.

Even more generally, provided that $\text{Re} ( \alpha_{j} ) > 0$ for all $1 \leq j \leq n$:

$$\frac{1}{A_{1}^{\alpha_{1}}\cdots A_{n}^{\alpha_{n}}} = \frac{\Gamma(\alpha_{1}+\dots+\alpha_{n})}{\Gamma(\alpha_{1})\cdots\Gamma(\alpha_{n})}\int_{0}^{1}du_{1}\cdots\int_{0}^{1}du_{n}\frac{\delta(1-\sum_{k=1}^{n}u_{k})\;u_{1}^{\alpha_{1}-1}\cdots u_{n}^{\alpha_{n}-1}}{\left(\sum_{k=1}^{n}u_{k}A_{k}\right)^{\sum_{k=1}^{n}\alpha_{k}}}$$

where the Gamma function $\Gamma$ was used.

== Derivation ==
$$\frac{1}{AB} = \frac{1}{A-B}\left(\frac{1}{B}-\frac{1}{A}\right)=\frac{1}{A-B}\int_B^A \frac{dz}{z^2}.$$

By using the substitution $u=(z-B)/(A-B)$, we have $du = dz/(A-B)$, and $z = uA + (1-u)B$, from which we get the desired result

$$\frac{1}{AB} = \int_0^1 \frac{du}{\left[uA + (1-u)B\right]^2}.$$

In more general cases, derivations can be done very efficiently using the Schwinger parametrization. For example, in order to derive the Feynman parametrized form of $\frac{1}{A_1...A_n}$, we first reexpress all the factors in the denominator in their Schwinger parametrized form:

$$\frac{1}{A_i}= \int^\infty_0 ds_i \, e^{-s_i A_i} \ \ \text{for } i =1,\ldots,n$$

and rewrite,

$$\frac{1}{A_1\cdots A_n}=\int_0^\infty ds_1\cdots \int_0^\infty ds_n \exp\left(-\left(s_1A_1+\cdots+s_nA_n\right)\right).$$

Then we perform the following change of integration variables,

$$\alpha  =  s_1+...+s_n,$$
$$\alpha_{i} = \frac{s_{i}}{s_1+\cdots+s_n}; \ i=1,\ldots,n-1,$$

to obtain,

$$\frac{1}{A_1\cdots A_n} = \int_{0}^{1}d\alpha_1\cdots d\alpha_{n-1} \int_{0}^{\infty}d\alpha\ \alpha^{n-1}\exp\left(-\alpha\left\{ \alpha_1A_1+\cdots+\alpha_{n-1}A_{n-1}+ \left(1-\alpha_{1}-\cdots-\alpha_{n-1}\right)A_{n}\right\} \right).$$

where $\int_{0}^{1}d\alpha_1\cdots d\alpha_{n-1}$ denotes integration over the region $0 \leq \alpha_i \leq 1$ with $\sum_{i=1}^{n-1} \alpha_i \leq 1$.

The next step is to perform the $\alpha$ integration.

$$\int_{0}^{\infty}d\alpha\ \alpha^{n-1}\exp(-\alpha x)= \frac{\partial^{n-1}}{\partial(-x)^{n-1}}\left(\int_{0}^{\infty}d\alpha\exp(-\alpha x)\right)=\frac{\left(n-1\right)!}{x^{n}}.$$

where we have defined $x= \alpha_1A_1+\cdots+\alpha_{n-1}A_{n-1}+ \left(1-\alpha_{1}-\cdots-\alpha_{n-1}\right)A_{n}.$

Substituting this result, we get to the penultimate form,

$$\frac{1}{A_1\cdots A_n}=\left(n-1\right)!\int_{0}^{1}d\alpha_1\cdots d\alpha_{n-1}\frac{1}{[\alpha_1A_1+\cdots+\alpha_{n-1}A_{n-1}+ \left(1-\alpha_{1}-\cdots-\alpha_{n-1}\right)A_{n}]^n} ,$$

and, after introducing an extra integral, we arrive at the final form of the Feynman parametrization, namely,

$$\frac{1}{A_1\cdots A_n}=\left(n-1\right)!\int_{0}^{1}d\alpha_1\cdots\int_{0}^{1}d\alpha_{n}\frac{\delta\left(1-\alpha_1-\cdots-\alpha_n\right)}{[\alpha_1A_1+\cdots+\alpha_{n}A_{n}]^n} .$$

Similarly, in order to derive the Feynman parametrization form of the most general case,$\frac{1}{A_1^{\alpha_1}...A_n^{\alpha_n}}$ one could begin with the suitable different Schwinger parametrization form of factors in the denominator, namely,

$$\frac{1}{A_1^{\alpha_1}} = \frac{1}{\left(\alpha_1-1\right)!}\int^\infty_0 ds_1 \,s_1^{\alpha_1-1} e^{-s_1 A_1} =  \frac{1}{\Gamma(\alpha_1)}\frac{\partial^{\alpha_1-1}}{\partial(-A_1)^{\alpha_1-1}}\left(\int_{0}^{\infty}ds_1 e^{-s_1 A_1}\right)$$

and then proceed exactly along the lines of previous case.

== Alternative form ==
An alternative form of the parametrization that is sometimes useful is

$$\frac{1}{AB} = \int_{0}^{\infty} \frac{d\lambda}{\left[\lambda A + B\right]^2}.$$

This form can be derived using the change of variables $\lambda = u / ( 1 - u )$. We can use the product rule to show that $d\lambda = du/(1-u)^{2}$, then

$$\begin{align}
\frac{1}{AB} & = \int^1_0 \frac{du}{\left[uA +(1-u)B\right]^2} \\
& = \int^1_0 \frac{du}{(1-u)^{2}} \frac{1}{\left[\frac{u}{1-u} A + B \right]^2} \\
& = \int_{0}^{\infty} \frac{d\lambda}{\left[\lambda A + B\right]^2} \\
\end{align}$$

More generally we have

$$\frac{1}{A^{m}B^{n}} = \frac{\Gamma( m+n)}{\Gamma(m)\Gamma(n)}\int_{0}^{\infty} \frac{\lambda^{m-1}d\lambda}{\left[\lambda A + B\right]^{n+m}},$$

where $\Gamma$ is the gamma function.

This form can be useful when combining a linear denominator $A$ with a quadratic denominator $B$, such as in heavy quark effective theory (HQET).

== Symmetric form ==
A symmetric form of the parametrization is occasionally used, where the integral is instead performed on the interval $[-1,1]$, leading to:

$$\frac{1}{AB} = 2\int_{-1}^1 \frac{du}{\left[(1+u)A + (1-u)B\right]^2}.$$
