= Loop integral =

Class of integrals appearing in quantum field theory

In quantum field theory and statistical mechanics, loop integrals are the integrals which appear when evaluating the Feynman diagrams with one or more loops by integrating over the internal momenta. These integrals are used to determine counterterms, which in turn allow evaluation of the beta function, which encodes the dependence of coupling $g$ for an interaction on an energy scale $\mu$.

== One-loop integral ==
=== Generic formula ===
A generic one-loop integral, for example those appearing in one-loop renormalization of QED or QCD may be written as a linear combination of terms in the form

$$\int \frac{d^dk}{(2\pi)^d}\frac{k_{\mu_1}\cdots k_{\mu_n}}{((k+q_1)^2 + m_1^2)\cdots((k+q_b)^2 + m_b^2)}$$

where the $q_i$ are 4-momenta which are linear combinations of the external momenta, and the $m_i$ are masses of interacting particles. This expression uses Euclidean signature. In Lorentzian signature the denominator would instead be a product of expressions of the form $(k+q)^2 - m^2 + i\epsilon$.

Using Feynman parametrization, this can be rewritten as a linear combination of integrals of the form

$$\int \frac{d^dl}{(2\pi)^d}\frac{l_{\mu_1}\cdots l_{\mu_n}}{(l^2 + \Delta)^b},$$

where the 4-vector $l$ and $\Delta$ are functions of the $q_i, m_i$ and the Feynman parameters. This integral is also integrated over the domain of the Feynman parameters. The integral is an isotropic tensor and so can be written as an isotropic tensor without $l$ dependence (but possibly dependent on the dimension $d$), multiplied by the integral

$$\int \frac{d^dl}{(2\pi)^d}\frac{(l^2)^a}{(l^2 + \Delta)^b}.$$

Note that if $n$ were odd, then the integral vanishes, so we can define $n = 2a$.

=== Regularizing the integral ===
==== Cutoff regularization ====
In Wilsonian renormalization, the integral is made finite by specifying a cutoff scale $\Lambda>0$. The integral to be evaluated is then

$$\int^\Lambda \frac{d^dl}{(2\pi)^d}\frac{(l^2)^a}{(l^2 + \Delta)^b},$$

where $\int^\Lambda$ is shorthand for integration over the domain $\{l\in \mathbb{R}^d: |l|<\Lambda\}$. The expression is finite, but in general as $\Lambda\rightarrow\infty$, the expression diverges.

==== Dimensional regularization ====
The integral without a momentum cutoff may be evaluated as

$$I_d(b,a,\Delta) := \int_{\mathbb{R}^d} \frac{d^dl}{(2\pi)^d}\frac{(l^2)^a}{(l^2 + \Delta)^b} = \frac{1}{(4\pi)^{d/2}}\frac{1}{\Gamma(d/2)}B\left(b-a-\frac{d}{2}, a + \frac{d}{2}\right)\Delta^{-(b-a-d/2)},$$

where $B$ is the Beta function. For calculations in the renormalization of QED or QCD, $a$ takes values $0,1$ and $2$.

For loop integrals in QFT, $B$ actually has a pole for relevant values of $a,b$ and $d$. For example in scalar $\phi^4$ theory in 4 dimensions, the loop integral in the calculation of one-loop renormalization of the interaction vertex has $(a,b,d) = (0,2,4)$. We use the 'trick' of dimensional regularization, analytically continuing $d$ to $d = 4 - \epsilon$ with $\epsilon$ a small parameter.

For calculation of counterterms, the loop integral should be expressed as a Laurent series in $\epsilon$. To do this, it is necessary to use the Laurent expansion of the Gamma function,

$$\Gamma(\epsilon) = \frac{1}{\epsilon} - \gamma + \mathcal{O}(\epsilon)$$

where $\gamma$ is the Euler–Mascheroni constant. In practice the loop integral generally diverges as $\epsilon\rightarrow 0$.

For full evaluation of the Feynman diagram, there may be algebraic factors which must be evaluated. For example in QED, the tensor indices of the integral may be contracted with Gamma matrices, and identities involving these are needed to evaluate the integral. In QCD, there may be additional Lie algebra factors, such as the quadratic Casimir of the adjoint representation as well as of any representations that matter (scalar or spinor fields) in the theory transform under.

=== Example ===
==== Scalar field theory ====
===== φ^{4} theory =====
The starting point is the action for $\phi^4$ theory in $\mathbb{R}^d$ is

$$S[\phi_0]=\int d^dx\frac{1}{2}(\partial \phi_0)^2 + \frac{1}{2}m_0\phi_0^2 + \frac{1}{4!}\lambda_0\phi_0^4.$$

Where $(\partial\phi_0)^2 = \nabla\phi_0\cdot\nabla\phi_0 = \sum_{i = 1}^d \partial_i\phi_0\partial_i\phi_0$. The domain is purposefully left ambiguous, as it varies depending on regularisation scheme.

The Euclidean signature propagator in momentum space is

$$\frac{1}{p^2 + m_0^2}.$$

The one-loop contribution to the two-point correlator $\langle \phi(x)\phi(y) \rangle$ (or rather, to the momentum space two-point correlator or Fourier transform of the two-point correlator) comes from a single Feynman diagram and is

$$\frac{\lambda_0}{2}\int \frac{d^dk}{(2\pi)^d}\frac{1}{k^2 + m_0^2}.$$

This is an example of a loop integral.

If $d\geq 2$ and the domain of integration is $\mathbb{R}^d$, this integral diverges. This is typical of the puzzle of divergences which plagued quantum field theory historically. To obtain finite results, we choose a regularization scheme. For illustration, we give two schemes.

Cutoff regularization: fix $\Lambda > 0$. The regularized loop integral is the integral over the domain $k = |\mathbf{k}| < \Lambda,$ and it is typical to denote this integral by

$$\frac{\lambda_0}{2}\int^\Lambda \frac{d^dk}{(2\pi)^d}\frac{1}{k^2 + m_0^2}.$$

This integral is finite and in this case can be evaluated.

Dimensional regularization: we integrate over all of $\mathbb{R}^d$, but instead of considering $d$ to be a positive integer, we analytically continue $d$ to $d = n - \epsilon$, where $\epsilon$ is small. By the computation above, we showed that the integral can be written in terms of expressions which have a well-defined analytic continuation from integers $n$ to functions on $\mathbb{C}$: specifically the gamma function has an analytic continuation and taking powers, $x^d$, is an operation which can be analytically continued.

== See also ==
- Regularization (physics)
- Renormalization
