= Hung Cheng =

American professor of applied mathematics

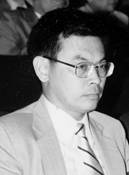
- Born: 鄭洪; March 2, 1937 (age 89); Canton (Guangzhou), Republic of China
- Education: California Institute of Technology (BS, PhD)
- Known for: Cheng–Wu theorem
- Scientific career
- Fields: Applied mathematics Theoretical physics
- Workplaces: Massachusetts Institute of Technology; Harvard University; California Institute of Technology
- Thesis: Spin Absorption of Solids (1961)
- Doctoral advisor: Leverett Davis, Jr.

Hung Cheng
- Traditional Chinese: 鄭洪
- Simplified Chinese: 郑洪
Transcriptions
Standard Mandarin
- Hanyu Pinyin: Zhèng Hóng
Yue: Cantonese
- Jyutping: zeng6 hung4

Hung Cheng (鄭洪; born March 2, 1937), also known as Hong Zheng, is an American mathematician, novelist, and physicist teaching at MIT.

== Education ==
Cheng earned his Bachelor of Science (B.S.) and Ph.D. from the California Institute of Technology, in 1959 and 1961, respectively. He had post-doctorate research appointments at Caltech, Princeton University and Harvard University before joining the MIT faculty in applied mathematics in 1965. His doctoral advisor was Leverett Davis, Jr., and his thesis was on spin absorption lines of solids.

== Career ==
In 1978, he was elected academician of Taiwan's Academia Sinica. He has also served as the chairman of the applied mathematics committee at the MIT Department of Mathematics, and is on the editorial board of the journal Studies in Applied Mathematics. His recent research interests have been directed to the mathematical physics of dark matter and dark energy. In 2017, Cheng received the Distinguished Achievement Award in Technology and Humanity/Humanities from the Chinese Institute of Engineers.

In 2016, Cheng published his first novel, Nanjing Never Cries.

== Personal life ==
Cheng lives in Brookline, Massachusetts.
