= Günter Wolf =

German water polo player

Personal information
- Nationality: German
- Born: 27 September 1949 (age 75); Würzburg, West Germany

Sport
- Sport: Water polo

Günter Wolf (born 27 September 1949) is a German water polo player. He competed at the 1972 Summer Olympics and the 1976 Summer Olympics.
