= NTS =

NTS may refer to:

== Radio and television ==
- NTS Radio, a British music online radio station
- National Traffic System, an organized network of amateur radio operators
- National Television Service, a television channel in Papua New Guinea
- Nederlandse Televisie Stichting (Dutch Television Foundation), the predecessor of Nederlandse Omroep Stichting

== Education ==
- National Technological University (United States), Fort Collins, Colorado
- National Testing Service, an academic testing service in Pakistan
- National Theatre School of Canada
- National Training System (Australia), the Australian system for vocational education and training
- National Treasury School, the French government's school for training civil servants
- Nazarene Theological Seminary, a theological seminary in Kansas City
- The Nelson Thomlinson School in Cumbria, Great Britain
- New Testament Studies, an academic journal

== Science ==
- Nevada Test Site, nuclear testing
- National Topographic System, used by Natural Resources Canada
- Nanotextured surface, a textured surface with various applications
- Non-topological soliton, in quantum field theory
- Neurotensin, a neuropeptide hormone
- Nucleus tractus solitarii (literally "nucleus of the solitary tract")
- NTS GmbH, Nature Technology Systems, Berlin, Germany

== Transportation ==
- Nashua Transit System, provides public transit services for the city of Nashua, New Hampshire
- Nashville Terminal Subdivision, a railroad line owned by CSX Transportation
- Nepal Transport Service, Nepalese public bus line

== Other ==
- NTS Motorsports, auto racing team, United States
- National Alliance of Russian Solidarists, Narodno-Trudovoy Soyuz, a Russian anti-communist organization
- National Tax Service (South Korea)
- National Theatre of Scotland
- National Ticketing Solution, a New Zealand public transport ticketing project
- National Transmission System, distributes gas throughout Great Britain
- National Trust for Scotland, a Scottish conservation organization
- Navigation Technology Satellite
- Network Time Security, a secure version of NTP
- Norwegian Sign Language, the principal sign language of Norway
- Null-terminated string, a data type in computer programming
