= Zhuxi =

Zhuxi may refer to:

== People ==
- Zhu Xi (朱熹; 1130–1200), Chinese philosopher
- Wang Zhuxi (王竹溪; 1911–1983), Chinese physicist, educator and philologist
- Zhao Zhu Xi (1900–1991), Chinese martial arts grand master

== Places ==
- Zhuxi County (竹溪县), Shiyan, Hubei, China
- Zhuxi, Xianju County (朱溪镇), town in Xianju County, Zhejiang, China

== Titles ==
- President of China (PRC, 中国国家主席), although "Zhuxi" does not mean "President" for equivalent titles elsewhere
- Chairman of the Communist Party (中共中央主席), its literal and original meaning
- Chairman of the Central Military Commission (中央军委主席)
