= Q-ball (disambiguation) =

Q-ball is a hypothetical form of matter (namely, a non-topological soliton) in theoretical physics.

Q-ball or Q Ball may refer to:

- Q Ball, the nickname of the dynamic pressure (Q) sensor module in the Apollo spacecraft launch escape system
- Q-ball, a slang term for the antipsychotic quetiapine, especially when mixed with stimulants

== See also ==
- Cue ball, the ball struck with the cue stick in billiards, pool, snooker, and other cue sports
- Cueball Carmichael, American professional wrestler, trainer and promoter
