= Q-ball =

Type of non-topological soliton

In theoretical physics, Q-ball is a type of non-topological soliton. A soliton is a localized field configuration that is stable—it cannot spread out and dissipate. In the case of a non-topological soliton, the stability is guaranteed by a conserved charge: the soliton has lower energy per unit charge than any other configuration (in physics, charge is often represented by the letter "Q", and the soliton is spherically symmetric, hence the name).

== Intuitive explanation ==
A Q-ball arises in a theory of bosonic particles when there is an attraction between the particles. Loosely speaking, the Q-ball is a finite-sized "blob" containing a large number of particles. The blob is stable against fission into smaller blobs and against "evaporation" via emission of individual particles, because, due to the attractive interaction, the blob is the lowest-energy configuration of that number of particles. (This is analogous to the fact that nickel-62 is the most stable nucleus because it is the most stable configuration of neutrons and protons. However, nickel-62 is not a Q-ball, in part because neutrons and protons are fermions, not bosons.)

For there to be a Q-ball, the number of particles must be conserved (i.e. the particle number is a conserved "charge", so the particles are described by a complex-valued field $\phi$), and the interaction potential $V(\phi)$ of the particles must have a negative (attractive) term. For non-interacting particles, the potential would be just a mass term $V_\text{free}(\phi) = m^2 |\phi|^2$, and there would be no Q-ball. But if one adds an attractive $-\lambda |\phi|^4$ term (and positive higher powers of $\phi$ to ensure that the potential has a lower bound), then there are values of $\phi$ where $V(\phi) < V_\text{free}(\phi)$, i.e. the energy of these field values is less than the energy of a free field. This corresponds to saying that one can create blobs of non-zero field (i.e. clusters of many particles) whose energy is lower than the same number of individual particles far apart. Those blobs are therefore stable against evaporation into individual particles.

== Construction ==
In its simplest form, a Q-ball is constructed in a field theory of a complex scalar field $\phi$, in which Lagrangian is invariant under a global $U(1)$ symmetry. The Q-ball solution is a state that minimizes energy while keeping the charge Q associated with the global $U(1)$ symmetry constant. A particularly transparent way of finding this solution is via the method of Lagrange multipliers. In particular, in three spatial dimensions we must minimize the functional

$$E_\omega = E + \omega \left[ Q - \frac{1}{2i} \int d^3\, x(\phi^* \partial_t \phi - \phi \partial_t \phi^*) \right],$$

where the energy is defined as

$$E = \int d^3\, x \left[ \frac{1}{2} \dot\phi^2 + \frac{1}{2} |\nabla \phi|^2 + U(\phi, \phi^*) \right],$$

and $\omega$ is our Lagrange multiplier. The time dependence of the Q-ball solution can be obtained easily if one rewrites the functional $E_\omega$ as

$$E_\omega = \int d^3\, x \left[ \frac{1}{2} |\dot\phi - i \omega \phi|^2 + \frac{1}{2} |\nabla \phi|^2 + \hat{U}_\omega(\phi, \phi^*) \right],$$

where $\hat{U}_\omega = U - \frac{1}{2} \omega^2 \phi^2$. Since the first term in the functional is now positive, minimization of this terms implies

$$\phi(\vec{r}, t) = \phi_{0}(\vec{r}) e^{i\omega t}.$$

We therefore interpret the Lagrange multiplier $\omega$ as the frequency of oscillation of the field within the Q-ball.

The theory contains Q-ball solutions if there are any values of $\phi^* \phi$ at which the potential is less than $m^2 \phi^* \phi$. In this case, a volume of space with the field at that value can have an energy per unit charge that is less than $m$, meaning that it cannot decay into a gas of individual particles. Such a region is a Q-ball. If it is large enough, its interior is uniform and is called "Q-matter". (For a review see Lee et al. (1992).

=== Thin-wall Q-balls ===
The thin-wall Q-ball was the first to be studied, and this pioneering work was carried out by Sidney Coleman in 1986. For this reason, Q-balls of the thin-wall variety are sometimes called "Coleman Q-balls".

We can think of this type of Q-ball a spherical ball of nonzero vacuum expectation value. In the thin-wall approximation we take the spatial profile of the field to be simply

$$\phi_0(r) = \theta(R - r) \phi_0.$$

In this regime the charge carried by the Q-ball is simply $Q = \omega \phi_0^2 V$. Using this fact, we can eliminate $\omega$ from the energy, such that we have

$$E = \frac{1}{2} \frac{Q^2}{\phi_0^2 V} + U(\phi_0) V.$$

Minimization with respect to $V$ gives

$$V = \sqrt{\frac{Q^2}{2 U(\phi_0) \phi_0^2}}.$$

Plugging this back into the energy yields

$$E = \sqrt{ \frac{2 U(\phi_0)}{\phi_0^2}}\, Q.$$

Now all that remains is to minimize the energy with respect to $\phi_0$. We can therefore state that a Q-ball solution of the thin-wall type exists if and only if

$\min = \frac{2 U(\phi)}{\phi^2}$ for $\phi > 0$.

When the above criterion is satisfied the Q-ball exists and by construction is stable against decays into scalar quanta. The mass of the thin-wall Q-ball is simply the energy

$$M(Q) = \omega_0 Q.$$

Although this kind of Q-ball is stable against decay into scalars, it is not stable against decay into fermions if the scalar field $\phi$ has nonzero Yukawa couplings to some fermions. This decay rate was calculated in 1986 by Andrew Cohen, Sidney Coleman, Howard Georgi, and Aneesh Manohar.

== History ==
Configurations of a charged scalar field that are classically stable (stable against small perturbations) were constructed by Gerald Rosen in 1968. Stable configurations of multiple scalar fields were studied by Richard M. Friedberg, T. D. Lee, and Alberto Sirlin in 1976. The name "Q-ball" and the proof of quantum-mechanical stability (stability against tunnelling to lower-energy configurations) come from Sidney Coleman.

== Occurrence in nature ==
It has been theorized that dark matter might consist of Q-balls (J. Frieman et al. 1988, Alexander Kusenko et al. 1997) and that Q-balls might play a role in baryogenesis, i.e. the origin of the matter that fills the universe (Dodelson et al. 1990, Enqvist et al. 1997). Interest in Q-balls was stimulated by the suggestion that they arise generically in supersymmetric field theories (A. Kusenko 1997), so if nature really is fundamentally supersymmetric, then Q-balls might have been created in the early universe and still exist in the cosmos today.

It has been hypothesised that the early universe had many energy lumps that consisted of Q-balls. When these eventually interacted with each other they "popped", i.e., dispersed, creating more matter particles than antimatter particles and explaining why matter predominates in the visible universe. It should be possible to verify this by detecting gravitational waves propagated by the "popping" of the Q-balls.

== Fiction ==
- In the movie Sunshine, the Sun is undergoing a premature death. The movie's science adviser, scientist Brian Cox, proposed "infection" with a Q-ball as the mechanism for this death, but this is mentioned only in the commentary tracks and not in the movie itself.
- In the fictional universe of Orion's Arm, Q-balls are one of the speculated sources for the large amounts of antimatter used by certain groups.
