= Byers–Yang theorem =

Theorem in quantum mechanics

In quantum mechanics, the Byers–Yang theorem states that all physical properties of a doubly connected system (an annulus) enclosing a magnetic flux $\Phi$ through the opening are periodic in the flux with period $\Phi_0=hc/e$ (the magnetic flux quantum). The theorem was first stated and proven by Nina Byers and Chen-Ning Yang (1961), and further developed by Felix Bloch (1970).

== Proof ==
An enclosed flux $\Phi$ corresponds to a vector potential $\mathbf A(\mathbf r)$ inside the annulus with a line integral $\oint_C \mathbf A\cdot \mathrm d\mathbf l=\Phi$ along any path $C$ that circulates around once. One can try to eliminate this vector potential by the gauge transformation

$$\psi'(\{\mathbf r_n\})=\exp\left(\frac{ie}{\hbar}\sum_j\chi(\mathbf r_j)\right)\psi(\{\mathbf r_n\})$$

of the wave function $\psi(\{\mathbf r_n\})$ of electrons at positions $\mathbf r_1,\mathbf r_2,\ldots$. The gauge-transformed wave function satisfies the same Schrödinger equation as the original wave function, but with a different magnetic vector potential $\mathbf A'(\mathbf r)=\mathbf A(\mathbf r)+\nabla\chi(\mathbf r)$. It is assumed that the electrons experience zero magnetic field $\mathbf B(\mathbf r)=\nabla\times \mathbf A(\mathbf r)=0$ at all points $\mathbf r$ inside the annulus, the field being nonzero only within the opening (where there are no electrons). It is then always possible to find a function $\chi(\mathbf r)$ such that $\mathbf A'(\mathbf r)=0$ inside the annulus, so one would conclude that the system with enclosed flux $\Phi$ is equivalent to a system with zero enclosed flux.

However, for any arbitrary $\Phi$ the gauge transformed wave function is no longer single-valued: The phase of $\psi'$ changes by

$$\delta\phi=\frac{e}{\hbar}\oint_C\nabla\chi(\mathbf r)\cdot \mathrm d \mathbf l=-\frac{e}{\hbar}\oint_C \mathbf A(\mathbf r)\cdot \mathrm d \mathbf l=-2\pi\frac{\Phi}{\Phi_0}$$

whenever one of the coordinates $\mathbf r_n$ is moved along the ring to its starting point. The requirement of a single-valued wave function therefore restricts the gauge transformation to fluxes $\Phi$ that are an integer multiple of $\Phi_0$. Systems that enclose a flux differing by a multiple of $h/e$ are equivalent.

== Applications ==
An overview of physical effects governed by the Byers–Yang theorem is given by Yoseph Imry. These include the Aharonov–Bohm effect, persistent current in normal metals, and flux quantization in superconductors.
