= Off-diagonal long-range order =

Quantum feature of condensed-matter systems

In condensed matter physics, an off-diagonal long-range order (ODLRO) is a feature of macroscopic quantum phenomena. It refers to off-diagonal elements in the density matrix separated in space in a many-body quantum mechanical system. An ODLRO implies correlations between distant particles in the system, indicating quantum behaviour. The concept is analogous to coherences and higher order coherences from quantum optics. An ODLRO is an indication of spontaneous symmetry breaking in the system.

ODLRO are different from the usual (diagonal) long-range order which is the kind of correlations that one finds in crystals and in many classical systems.

The concept was first introduced by Oliver Penrose in 1951, and by Penrose and Lars Onsager in 1956, to study superfluidity and Bose–Einstein condensates. Its mathematical definition in terms of density matrices was done by C.N. Yang in 1962, who coined the term ODLRO and generalized it to other systems like superconductivity.

== Density matrix and long-range order ==
In terms of canonical quantization, the one-body density matrix can be written as
$$\rho (\mathbf r,\mathbf r')=\langle \hat{\psi}(\mathbf r)\hat{\psi}^\dagger(\mathbf r')\rangle$$
where $\langle\cdot\rangle$ indicates the expectation value of the state of the system, $\hat{\psi}(\mathbf r)$ is the field operator describing the system at position $\mathbf r$. The $\rho(\mathbf r,\mathbf r' )$ with $\mathbf r\neq\mathbf r'$ are the off-diagonal elements and $\rho(\mathbf r,\mathbf r) = n(\mathbf r)$ is the diagonal element describing the local density. The density matrix is normalized such that integrating over the volume, as
$$\int n(\mathbf r)\mathrm d^3 \mathbf r=N,$$
recovers the number of particles N.

If the $n(\mathbf r)$ is not constant, then the system has a diagonal long-range order (DLRO). For example, a crystal lattice has a diagonal element $n(\mathbf r)$ that oscillates with $\mathbf r$ (DLRO).

== Bosonic systems ==
To understand if a system has a off-diagonal long-range order (ODLRO) one calculates the $\rho(\mathbf r,\mathbf r' )$ for large separations $|\mathbf r-\mathbf r' |\to\infty$. If the off-diagonal terms $\rho(\mathbf r,\mathbf r' )$ are not null at long-range, then the systems possesses an off-diagonal long-range order (ODLRO).

The Penrose–Onsager criterion stipulates that a if a bosonic system has an ODLRO, the system presents macroscopic quantum behaviour.

For Bose–Einstein condensates it can be shown that below a certain temperature
$$\lim_{|\mathbf r-\mathbf r'|\to\infty}\rho (\mathbf r,\mathbf r')=N/V$$
where V is the volume. Thus Bose–Einstein condensates possess an ODLRO. The existence of an ODLRO is the consequence of many properties in superfluidity, like irrotational flow and quantization of vortex. A system that possesses both DLRO like a crystal and ODLRO is expected to be a supersolid.

Light can also possess ODLRO, as is the case of coherent sources like lasers.

== Fermionic systems ==
Systems of fermions cannot possess a one-body ODLRO. However, when positive interactions are present the formation of Cooper pairs allows for a fermionic condensate with a two-body ODLRO. In the case of superconductivity, one can define the two-body density matrix as:
$$\rho^{(2)} (\mathbf r_1,\mathbf r_2;\mathbf r_1',\mathbf r_2')=\langle \hat{\psi}_\uparrow(\mathbf r_1)\hat{\psi}_\downarrow(\mathbf r_2)\hat{\psi}^\dagger_\downarrow(\mathbf r_2')\hat{\psi}^\dagger_\uparrow(\mathbf r_1')\rangle$$
where $s=\uparrow,\downarrow$ indicates the two spin values for a spin-1/2 particle like the electron. For large range, $|\mathbf r_1-\mathbf r_1' |\to\infty$ and $|\mathbf r_2-\mathbf r_2' |\to\infty$, a finite value indicates an ODLRO.

The presence of an ODLRO indicates macroscopic quantum behaviour, this is the case of superconductivity. Normal conductors have no ODLRO.

The ODLRO explains flux quantization in superconductors. In a superconducting ring, the magnetic flux is quantized in units of magnetic flux quanta $h/2e$ where $h$ is the Planck constant and $e$ the elementary charge, instead of the usual $h/e$ for normal conductors. The necessity of pair ODLRO implies that the basic unit of coherent states in superconductors consists of pair of electrons. The Meissner effect is also a consequence of ODLRO.

== Other systems ==
Anyons, particles that are neither bosons or fermions, are expected to be present in the fractional quantum Hall effect (FQHE). The existence of an ODLRO due to anyons has been investigated and calculated under certain conditions to explain the FQHE.
