= Lee–Yang theory =

Statistical mechanics model for phase transitions

In statistical mechanics, Lee–Yang theory, sometimes also known as Yang–Lee theory, is a scientific theory which seeks to describe phase transitions in large physical systems in the thermodynamic limit based on the properties of small, finite-size systems. The theory revolves around the complex zeros of partition functions of finite-size systems and how these may reveal the existence of phase transitions in the thermodynamic limit.

Lee–Yang theory constitutes an indispensable part of the theories of phase transitions. Originally developed for the Ising model, the theory has been extended and applied to a wide range of models and phenomena, including protein folding, percolation, complex networks, and molecular zippers.

The theory is named after the Nobel laureates Tsung-Dao Lee and Yang Chen-Ning, who were awarded the 1957 Nobel Prize in Physics for their unrelated work on parity non-conservation in weak interaction.

== Introduction ==
For an equilibrium system in the canonical ensemble, all statistical information about the system is encoded in the partition function,

$$Z = \sum_i e^{-\beta E_i},$$

where the sum runs over all possible microstates, and $\beta =1/(k_B T)$ is the inverse temperature, $k_B$ is the Boltzmann constant and $E_i$ is the energy of a microstate. The moments $\langle E^n \rangle$ of the energy statistics are obtained by differentiating the partition function with respect to the inverse temperature multiple times,

$$\langle E^n \rangle = \frac{1}{Z} \partial^n_{-\beta} Z = \frac{\sum_i E_i^n e^{-\beta E_i}}{\sum_i e^{-\beta E_i}}.$$

From the partition function, we may also obtain the free energy

$$F = -\beta^{-1} \log[Z].$$

Analogously to how the partition function generates the moments, the free energy generates the cumulants of the energy statistics

$$\langle \!\langle E^n \rangle \!\rangle = \partial^n_{-\beta} (-\beta F).$$

More generally, if the microstate energies $E_i(q) =E_i(0)-q\Phi_i$ depend on a control parameter $q$ and a fluctuating conjugate variable $\Phi$ (whose value may depend on the microstate), the moments of $\Phi$ may be obtained as

$$\langle \Phi^n \rangle = \frac{1}{Z}\beta^{-n}\partial^n_{q} Z(q) =\frac{1}{Z} \beta^{-n}\partial^n_{q} \sum_i e^{-\beta E_i(q)}= \frac{\sum_i \Phi_i^n e^{\beta E_i(0)+\beta q \Phi_i}}{\sum_i e^{\beta E_i(0)+\beta q \Phi_i}},$$

and the cumulants as

$$\langle \!\langle \Phi^n \rangle \!\rangle = \beta^{-n}\partial^n_{q} [-\beta F(q)].$$

For instance, for a spin system, the control parameter may be an external magnetic field, $q=h$, and the conjugate variable may be the total magnetization, $\Phi = M$.

=== Phase transitions and Lee–Yang theory ===
Illustration of how the zeros closest to the real axis (red circles) in the complex plane of the control parameter $q$ may move, with increasing system size $N$, towards the (real) critical value $q^*$ (filled circle) for which a phase transition takes place in the thermodynamic limit.

The partition function and the free energy are intimately linked to phase transitions, for which there is a sudden change in the properties of a physical system. Mathematically, a phase transition occurs when the partition function vanishes and the free energy is singular (non-analytic). For instance, if the first derivative of the free energy with respect to the control parameter is non-continuous, a jump may occur in the average value of the fluctuating conjugate variable, such as the magnetization, corresponding to a first-order phase transition.

Importantly, for a finite-size system, $Z(q)$ is a finite sum of exponential functions and is thus always positive for real values of $q$. Consequently, $F(q)$ is always well-behaved and analytic for finite system sizes. By contrast, in the thermodynamic limit, $F(q)$ may exhibit a non-analytic behavior.

Using that $Z(q)$ is an entire function for finite system sizes, Lee–Yang theory takes advantage of the fact that the partition function can be fully characterized by its zeros in the complex plane of $q$. These zeros are often known as Lee–Yang zeros or, in the case of inverse temperature as control parameter, Fisher zeros. The main idea of Lee–Yang theory is to mathematically study how the positions and the behavior of the zeros change as the system size grows. If the zeros move onto the real axis of the control parameter in the thermodynamic limit, it signals the presence of a phase transition at the corresponding real value of $q=q^*$.

In this way, Lee–Yang theory establishes a connection between the properties (the zeros) of a partition function for a finite size system and phase transitions that may occur in the thermodynamic limit (where the system size goes to infinity).

== Examples ==
=== Molecular zipper ===
The molecular zipper is a toy model which may be used to illustrate the Lee–Yang theory. It has the advantage that all quantities, including the zeros, can be computed analytically. The model is based on a double-stranded macromolecule with $N$ links that can be either open or closed. For a fully closed zipper, the energy is zero, while for each open link the energy is increased by an amount $\varepsilon$. A link can only be open if the preceding one is also open.

For a number $g$ of different ways that a link can be open, the partition function of a zipper with $N$ links reads

$$Z = \sum_{n=0}^Ng^n e^{-\beta n \varepsilon} = \frac{1-(ge^{-\beta \varepsilon})^{N+1}}{1-ge^{-\beta \varepsilon}}$$.

This partition function has the complex zeros

$$\beta_k = \beta_c + \frac{2\pi k}{\varepsilon (N+1)}i, \qquad k \in \{-N,...,N\}\backslash \{0\},$$

where we have introduced the critical inverse temperature $\beta_c^{-1} = k_B T_c$, with $T_c = \frac{\varepsilon}{k_B \log g}$. We see that in the limit $N\rightarrow \infty$, the zeros closest to the real axis approach the critical value $\beta_k = \beta_c$. For $g=1$, the critical temperature is infinite and no phase transition takes place for finite temperature. By contrast, for $g>1$, a phase transition takes place at the finite temperature $T_c$.

To confirm that the system displays a non-analytic behavior in the thermodynamic limit, we consider the free energy $F = - k_B T \log Z$ or, equivalently, the dimensionless free energy per link $\frac{F}{N \varepsilon}.$ In the thermodynamic limit, one obtains

$$\lim_{N\rightarrow \infty}\frac{F}{N\varepsilon} = \lim_{N\rightarrow \infty}-\frac{\beta^{-1}}{N\varepsilon} \log\left[\frac{1-(ge^{-\beta \varepsilon})^{N+1}}{1-ge^{-\beta \varepsilon}}\right] =\begin{cases}
1-T/T_c, & T > T_c\\
0, & T \leq T_c
\end{cases}$$.

Indeed, a cusp develops at $T_c$ in the thermodynamic limit. In this case, the first derivative of the free energy is discontinuous, corresponding to a first-order phase transition.

=== Ising model ===
The Ising model is the original model that Lee and Yang studied when they developed their theory on partition function zeros. The Ising model consists of spin lattice with $N$ spins $\{\sigma_k\}$, each pointing either up, $\sigma_k=+1$, or down, $\sigma_k=-1$. Each spin may also interact with its closest spin neighbors with a strength $J_{ij}$. In addition, an external magnetic field $h>0$ may be applied (here we assume that it is uniform and thus independent of the spin indices). The Hamiltonian of the system for a certain spin configuration $\{\sigma_i\}$ then reads

$$H(\{\sigma_i\},h) = - \sum_{\langle i,j\rangle} J_{ij} \sigma_i \sigma_j -  h \sum_j \sigma_j.$$

In this case, the partition function reads

$$Z(h) = \sum_{\{\sigma_i\}} e^{-\beta H(\{\sigma_i\},h)}$$

The zeros of this partition function cannot be determined analytically, thus requiring numerical approaches.

==== Lee–Yang theorem ====
For the ferromagnetic Ising model, for which $J_{ij} \geq 0$ for all $i, j$, Lee and Yang showed that all zeros of $Z(h)$ lie on the unit circle in the complex plane of the parameter $z\equiv \exp(-2 \beta h)$. This statement is known as the Lee–Yang theorem, and has later been generalized to other models, such as the Heisenberg model.

=== Dynamical phase transitions ===
A similar approach can be used to study dynamical phase transitions. These transitions are characterized by the Loschmidt amplitude, which plays the analogue role of a partition function.

== Connections to fluctuations ==
The Lee–Yang zeros may be connected to the cumulants of the conjugate variable $\Phi$ of the control variable $q$. For brevity, we set $\beta = 1$ in the following. Using that the partition function is an entire function for a finite-size system, one may expand it in terms of its zeros as

$$Z(q) = Z(0)e^{cq}\prod_k (1-q/q_k),$$

where $Z(0)$ and $c$ are constants, and $q_k$ is the $k$:th zero in the complex plane of $q$. The corresponding free energy then reads

$$-F(q) = \log[Z(q)] = \log[Z(0)]+cq+\sum_k \log[1-q/q_k].$$

Differentiating this expression $n$ times with respect to $q$, yields the $n$:th order cumulant

$$\langle \!\langle \Phi^n \rangle \!\rangle =  \partial^n_q [-F(q)] = -\sum_k \frac{(n-1)!}{(q_k-q)^n}, \quad n>1.$$

Furthermore, using that the partition function is a real function, the Lee–Yang zeros have to come in complex conjugate pairs, allowing us to express the cumulants as

$$\langle \!\langle \Phi^n \rangle \!\rangle =  -(n-1)!\sum_k \frac{2 \cos(n \arg\{q_k-q\})}{|q_k-q|^n}, \quad n>1,$$

where the sum now runs only over each pair of zeros. This establishes a direct connection between cumulants and Lee–Yang zeros.

Moreover, if $n$ is large, the contribution from zeros lying far away from $q$ is strongly suppressed, and only the closest pair $q_0$ of zeros plays an important role. One may then write

$$\langle \!\langle \Phi^n \rangle \!\rangle \simeq  -(n-1)!\frac{2 \cos(n \arg\{q_0-q\})}{|q_0-q|^n}, \quad n\gg 1.$$

This equation may be solved as a linear system of equations, allowing for the Lee–Yang zeros to be determined directly from higher-order cumulants of the conjugate variable:

$$\begin{bmatrix}2 \text{Re}[q-q_0] \\ |q-q_0| \end{bmatrix} = \begin{bmatrix}1 & -\frac{\kappa^{(+)}_n}{n}\\ 1 & -\frac{\kappa^{(+)}_{n+1}}{n+1} \end{bmatrix}^{-1} \begin{bmatrix}(n-1) \kappa_n^{(-)} \\ n \kappa_{n+1}^{(-)} \end{bmatrix}, \qquad \kappa^{\pm} \equiv \frac{\langle \!\langle \Phi^{n\pm1}\rangle\!\rangle}{\langle \!\langle \Phi^{n}\rangle\!\rangle}.$$

== Experiments ==
Being complex numbers of a physical variable, Lee–Yang zeros have traditionally been seen as a purely theoretical tool to describe phase transitions, with little or none connection to experiments. However, in a series of experiments in the 2010s, various kinds of Lee–Yang zeros have been determined from real measurements. In one experiment in 2015, the Lee–Yang zeros were extracted experimentally by measuring the quantum coherence of a spin coupled to an Ising-type spin bath. In another experiment in 2017, dynamical Lee–Yang zeros were extracted from Andreev tunneling processes between a normal-state island and two superconducting leads. Furthermore, in 2018, there was an experiment determining the dynamical Fisher zeros of the Loschmidt amplitude, which may be used to identify dynamical phase transitions.

== See also ==
- Lee–Yang theorem
