= Lee–Yang theorem =

Theorem in statistical mechanics

In statistical mechanics, the Lee–Yang theorem states that if partition functions of certain models in statistical field theory with ferromagnetic interactions are considered as functions of an external field, then all zeros are purely imaginary (or on the unit circle after a change of variable). The first version was proved for the Ising model by T. D. Lee and C. N. Yang (1952) (Lee & Yang 1952). Their result was later extended to more general models by several people. Asano in 1970 extended the Lee–Yang theorem to the Heisenberg model and provided a simpler proof using Asano contractions. Simon & Griffiths (1973) extended the Lee–Yang theorem to certain continuous probability distributions by approximating them by a superposition of Ising models. Newman (1974) gave a general theorem stating roughly that the Lee–Yang theorem holds for a ferromagnetic interaction provided it holds for zero interaction. Lieb & Sokal (1981) generalized Newman's result from measures on R to measures on higher-dimensional Euclidean space.

There has been some speculation about a relationship between the Lee–Yang theorem and the Riemann hypothesis about the Riemann zeta function; see (Knauf 1999).

== Statement ==
=== Preliminaries ===
Along the formalization in Newman (1974) the Hamiltonian is given by

$$H = -\sum J_{jk} S_j S_k - \sum z_j S_j$$

where S_{j}'s are spin variables, z_{j} external field. The system is said to be ferromagnetic if all the coefficients in the interaction term J_{jk} are non-negative reals.

The partition function is given by

$$Z = \int e^{- H} d\mu_1(S_1)\cdots d\mu_N(S_N)$$

where each dμ_{j} is an even measure on the reals R decreasing at infinity so fast that all Gaussian functions are integrable, i.e.

$$\int e^{b S^2} d|\mu_j(S)| < \infty , \, \forall b \in \mathbb{R}.$$

A rapidly decreasing measure on the reals is said to have the Lee-Yang property if all zeros of its Fourier transform are real as the following.

$$\int e^{h S} d\mu_j(S) \neq 0 , \, \forall h \in \mathbb{H}_{+} := \{ z \in \mathbb{C} \mid \Re(z)>0 \}$$

=== Theorem ===
The Lee–Yang theorem states that if the Hamiltonian is ferromagnetic and all the measures dμ_{j} have the Lee-Yang property, and all the numbers z_{j} have positive real part, then the partition function is non-zero.

$$Z(\{ z_j \}) \neq 0 , \, \forall z_j \in \mathbb{H}_{+}$$

In particular if all the numbers z_{j} are equal to some number z, then all zeros of the partition function (considered as a function of z) are imaginary.

In the original Ising model case considered by Lee and Yang, the measures all have support on the 2 point set −1, 1, so the partition function can be considered a function of the variable ρ = e^{πz}. With this change of variable the Lee–Yang theorem says that all zeros ρ lie on the unit circle.

== Examples ==
Some examples of measure with the Lee–Yang property are:

- The measure of the Ising model, which has support consisting of two points (usually 1 and −1) each with weight 1/2. This is the original case considered by Lee and Yang.
- The distribution of spin n/2, whose support has n+1 equally spaced points, each of weight 1/(n + 1). This is a generalization of the Ising model case.
- The density of measure uniformly distributed between −1 and 1.
- The density $\exp(-\lambda\cosh(S))\,dS$
- The density $\exp(-\lambda S^4-bS^2)\,dS$ for positive λ and real b. This corresponds to the (φ^{4})_{2} Euclidean quantum field theory.
- The density $\exp(-\lambda S^6- aS^4-bS^2)\,dS$ for positive λ does not always have the Lee-Yang property.
- If dμ has the Lee-Yang property, so does exp(bS^{2}) dμ for any positive b.
- If dμ has the Lee-Yang property, so does Q(S) dμ for any even polynomial Q all of whose zeros are imaginary.
- The convolution of two measures with the Lee-Yang property also has the Lee-Yang property.

== See also ==
- Lee–Yang theory
