= Michael Nauenberg =

American physicist (1934–2019)

- Born: December 19, 1934; Berlin, Germany
- Died: July 22, 2019 (aged 84); Santa Cruz, California
- Citizenship: United States
- Education: Massachusetts Institute of Technology (B.S.); Cornell University (Ph.D.)
- Known for: Kinoshita-Lee-Nauenberg theorem
- Spouse: Josette Nauenberg
- Children: Peter Nauenberg; Maria Neumann; Tanya Nauenberg-Blakeslee; Sander Nauenberg; Saskia Nauenberg Dunkell
- Scientific career
- Fields: theoretical physics
- Institutions: University of California, Santa Cruz
- Thesis: The inelastic scattering of mesons and baryons (1960)
- Doctoral advisor: Hans Bethe

Michael Nauenberg (19 December 1934 – 22 July 2019) was an American theoretical physicist and physics historian.

== Life ==
Born to a secular Jewish family in Berlin, his family emigrated to Barranquilla, Colombia in 1939 to escape persecution from the Nazis in World War II. When he moved to the United States in the 1950s, Nauenberg studied at the Massachusetts Institute of Technology and received his doctorate in 1960 from Cornell University under Hans Bethe with a thesis on particle physics. He then became a visiting fellow at the Institute for Advanced Study. From 1961 to 1965, he was Assistant Professor of Physics at Columbia University. From 1964 to 1966 he was Visiting Physicist at Stanford Linear Accelerator Center and Stanford University. In 1966 he became Professor of physics at the University of California, Santa Cruz (UCSC). He played a crucial role in the development of the UCSC Physics Department in its early days and he was instrumental in developing both Stevenson and Crown Colleges. He was also from 1988 to 1994 director of the Institute for Nonlinear Science at UCSC. After his retirement in 1994, he became Research Professor of Physics at UCSC. He was a visiting professor at various research institutions and universities in Europe.

Nauenberg worked in the field of particle and nuclear physics as well as theoretical solid state physics, astrophysics and nonlinear dynamics. His most-cited result, written in collaboration with Nobel laureate Tsung-Dao Lee, is the Kinoshita-Lee-Nauenberg theorem (KLN theorem). Since the 1990s, he has published numerous works on the history of science, especially about physicists from the 17th century. Among them are works on the work of Isaac Newton, Robert Hooke and Christiaan Huygens. In addition, he published contributions to 20th-century physicists, including Edmund Clifton Stoner and Subrahmanyan Chandrasekhar.

From 1963 to 1964 he held a Guggenheim Fellowship, and from 1964 to 1966 he was a Sloan Research Fellow. From 1989 to 1990 he was a scholarship holder of the Alexander von Humboldt Foundation. In 2013, he received the Constantine Panunzio Distinguished Emeriti Award for his influential work on the history of science.

When Nauenberg died in 2019, the UCSC Emeriti Association and the Nauenberg family established a History of Science Lecture series at UCSC in his honor.
