= Tsung-Dao Lee =

Chinese-American physicist (1926–2024)

- 李政道
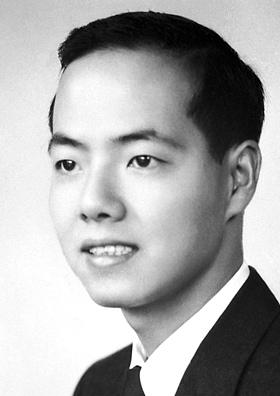
- Lee in 1956
- Born: November 24, 1926; Shanghai, Republic of China
- Died: August 4, 2024 (aged 97); San Francisco, California, U.S.
- Citizenship: Republic of China; United States
- Education: National Che Kiang University: National Southwestern Associated University; University of Chicago (PhD)
- Known for: Lee–Yang theory: Lee–Yang theorem; Kinoshita–Lee–Nauenberg theorem; G-parity; Non-topological solitons; Parity violation
- Relatives: Robert C. T. Lee (brother)
- Awards: Nobel Prize in Physics (1957): Albert Einstein Award (1957); Guggenheim Fellowship (1966); Oskar Klein Memorial Lecture (1993); Matteucci Medal (1995)
- Scientific career
- Fields: Physics
- Workplaces: Columbia University; Institute for Advanced Study; University of California, Berkeley
- Thesis: Hydrogen Content and Energy-productive Mechanism of White Dwarfs (1950)
- Doctoral advisor: Enrico Fermi
- Doctoral students: Richard M. Friedberg: Norman Christ; Gerald Feinberg

Chinese name
- Chinese: 李政道
Transcriptions
Standard Mandarin
- Hanyu Pinyin: Lǐ Zhèngdào
- Wade–Giles: Li3 Cheng4-tao4
- IPA: [lì ʈʂə̂ŋ.tâʊ]
Wu
- Romanization: Lî Tsěn-dâu

Signature
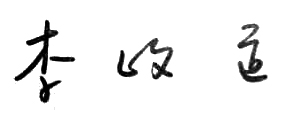

Tsung-Dao Lee (Chinese: 李政道; pinyin: Lǐ Zhèngdào; November 24, 1926 – August 4, 2024) was a Chinese-American physicist known for his work on parity violation, the Lee–Yang theorem, particle physics, relativistic heavy ion (RHIC) physics, nontopological solitons, and soliton stars. He was a university professor emeritus at Columbia University in New York City, where he taught from 1953 until his retirement in 2012.

In 1957, at the age of 30, Lee won the Nobel Prize in Physics with Chen Ning Yang for their work on the violation of the parity law in weak interactions, which Chien-Shiung Wu experimentally proved from 1956 to 1957, with her well known Wu experiment.

Lee remains the youngest Nobel laureate in the science fields after World War II. He is the third-youngest Nobel laureate in sciences in history after William L. Bragg (who won the prize at 25 with his father William H. Bragg in 1915) and Werner Heisenberg (who won in 1932 also at 30). Lee and Yang were the first Chinese laureates. Since he became a naturalized American citizen in 1963, Lee is also the youngest American ever to have won a Nobel Prize.

== Biography ==
=== Family ===
Lee was born in Shanghai, China, with his ancestral home in nearby Suzhou. His father Chun-kang Lee (李駿康; Lǐ Jùn-kāng), one of the first graduates of the University of Nanking, was a chemical industrialist and merchant who was involved in China's early development of modern synthesized fertilizer. Lee's grandfather Chong-tan Lee (李仲覃; Lǐ Zhòng-tán) was the first Chinese Methodist Episcopal senior pastor of St. John's Church in Suzhou.

Lee had four brothers and one sister. Educator Robert C. T. Lee was one of T. D.'s brothers. Lee's mother Chang and brother Robert C. T. moved to Taiwan in the 1950s.

=== Early life ===
Lee received his secondary education in Shanghai (High School Affiliated to Soochow University, 東吳大學附屬中學) and Jiangxi (Jiangxi Joint High School, 江西聯合中學). Due to the Second Sino-Japanese War, Lee's high school education was interrupted, thus he did not obtain his secondary diploma. Nevertheless, in 1943, Lee directly applied to and was admitted by the National Chekiang University (now Zhejiang University). Initially, Lee registered as a student in the Department of Chemical Engineering. Very quickly, Lee's talent was discovered and his interest in physics grew rapidly. Several physics professors, including Shu Xingbei and Wang Ganchang, largely guided Lee, and he soon transferred into the Department of Physics of National Che Kiang University, where he studied in 1943–1944.

However, again disrupted by a further Japanese invasion, Lee continued at the National Southwestern Associated University in Kunming the next year in 1945, where he studied with Professor Wu Ta-You.

=== Life and research in the U.S. ===
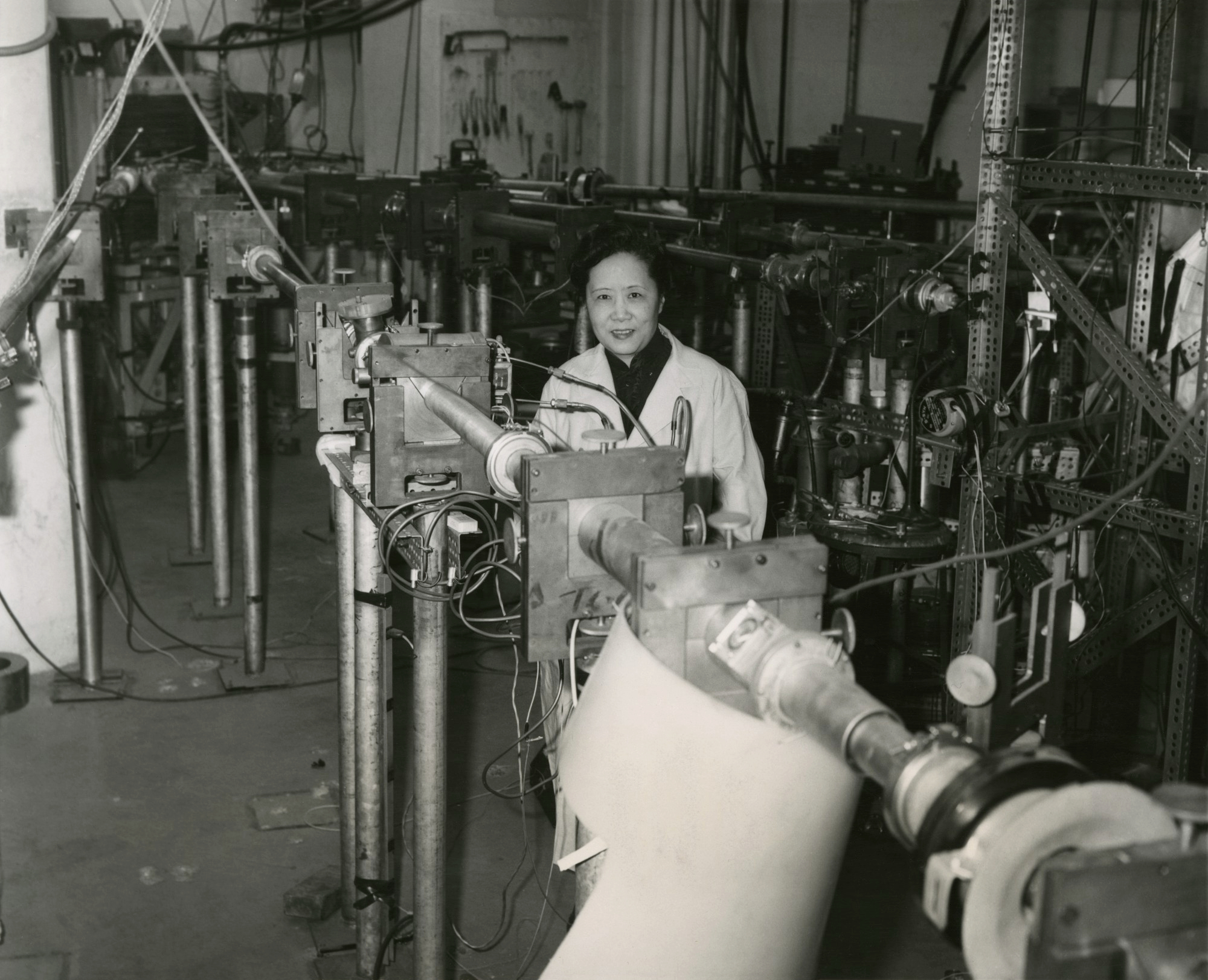
Chien-Shiung Wu, designer of the Wu experiment that violated parity

Professor Wu nominated Lee for a Chinese government fellowship for graduate study in the United States. In 1946, Lee went to the University of Chicago and was selected by Professor Enrico Fermi to become his PhD student. Lee received his PhD under Fermi in 1950 for his research work Hydrogen Content of White Dwarf Stars. Lee served as research associate and lecturer in physics at the University of California at Berkeley from 1950 to 1951.

In 1953, Lee joined Columbia University, where he remained until retirement. His first work at Columbia was on a solvable model of quantum field theory better known as the Lee model. Soon, his focus turned to particle physics and the developing puzzle of K meson decays. Lee realized in early 1956 that the key to the puzzle was parity non-conservation. At Lee's suggestion, the first experimental test was on hyperon decay by the Steinberger group. At that time, the experimental result gave only an indication of a 2 standard deviation effect of possible parity violation. Encouraged by this feasibility study, Lee made a systematic study of possible Time reversal (T), Parity (P), Charge Conjugation (C), and CP violations in weak interactions with collaborators, including C. N. Yang. After the definitive experimental confirmation by Chien-Shiung Wu and her assistants that showed that parity was not conserved, Lee and Yang were awarded the 1957 Nobel Prize in Physics. Wu was not awarded the Nobel prize, which is considered a notable controversy in Nobel committee history.

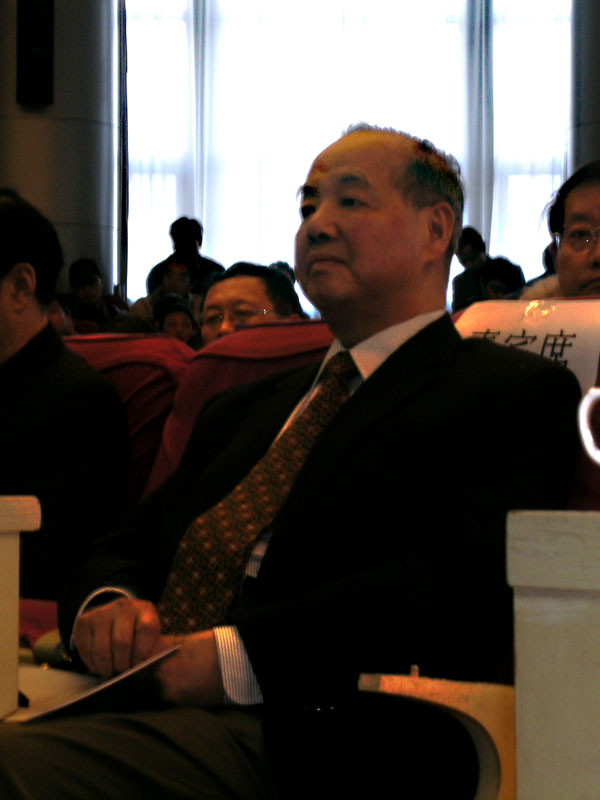
Tsung-Dao Lee at a conference in Tsinghua University, 2006

In the early 1960s, Lee and collaborators initiated the important field of high-energy neutrino physics. In 1964, Lee, with Michael Nauenberg, analyzed the divergences connected with particles of zero rest mass, and described a general method known as the KLN theorem for dealing with these divergences, which still plays an important role in contemporary work in QCD, with its massless, self-interacting gluons. In 1974–75, Lee published several papers on "A New Form of Matter in High Density", which led to the modern field of RHIC physics, now dominating the entire high-energy nuclear physics field.

Besides particle physics, Lee was active in statistical mechanics, astrophysics, hydrodynamics, many body system, solid state, and lattice QCD. In 1983, Lee wrote a paper entitled, "Can Time Be a Discrete Dynamical Variable?"; which led to a series of publications by Lee and collaborators on the formulation of fundamental physics in terms of difference equations, but with exact invariance under continuous groups of translational and rotational transformations. Beginning in 1975, Lee and collaborators established the field of non-topological solitons, which led to his work on soliton stars and black holes throughout the 1980s and 1990s.

From 1997 to 2003, Lee was director of the RIKEN-BNL Research Center (now director emeritus), which together with other researchers from Columbia, completed a 1 teraflops supercomputer QCDSP for lattice QCD in 1998 and a 10 teraflops QCDOC machine in 2005. Leading up to 2005, Lee and Richard M. Friedberg developed a new method to solve the Schrödinger equation, leading to convergent iterative solutions for the long-standing quantum degenerate double-wall potential and other instanton problems. They also did work on the neutrino mapping matrix.

Lee was one of the 20 American recipients of the Nobel Prize in Physics to sign a letter addressed to President George W. Bush in May 2008, urging him to "reverse the damage done to basic science research in the Fiscal Year 2008 Omnibus Appropriations Bill" by requesting additional emergency funding for the Department of Energy's Office of Science, the National Science Foundation, and the National Institute of Standards and Technology.

== Educational activities ==
Soon after the re-establishment of China-American relations with the PRC, Lee and his wife, Jeannette Hui-Chun Chin (秦惠䇹; Qín Huìjūn), were able to go to the PRC, where Lee gave a series of lectures and seminars, and organized the CUSPEA (China-U.S. Physics Examination and Application).

In 1998, Lee established the Chun-Tsung Endowment (秦惠䇹—李政道中国大学生见习基金) in memory of his wife, who had died three years earlier. The Chun-Tsung scholarships, supervised by the United Board for Christian Higher Education in Asia (New York), are awarded to undergraduates, usually in their 2nd or 3rd year, at six universities, which are Shanghai Jiaotong University, Fudan University, Lanzhou University, Soochow University, Peking University, and Tsinghua University. Students selected for such scholarships are named "Chun-Tsung Scholars" (䇹政学者).

== Personal life and death ==
Lee and Jeannette Hui-Chun Chin (Chinese: 秦惠䇹; pinyin: Qín Huìjūn) married in 1950 and had two sons: James Lee (Chinese: 李中清; pinyin: Lǐ Zhōngqīng) and Stephen Lee (Chinese: 李中汉; pinyin: Lǐ Zhōnghàn). His wife died in 1996. James donated his father's Nobel Prize medal to Shanghai Jiao Tong University in 2014 where it is on display in the Tsung-Dao Lee Library.

Tsung-Dao Lee died in San Francisco on August 4, 2024, at the age of 97.

== Honours and awards ==
Awards

- Nobel Prize in Physics (1957)
- G. Bude Medal, Collège de France (1969, 1977)
- Galileo Galilei Medal (1979)
- Order of Merit, Grande Ufficiale, Italy (1986)
- Oskar Klein Memorial Lecture and Medal (1993)
- Science for Peace Prize (1994)
- China National-International Cooperation Award (1995)
- Matteucci Medal (1995)
- Naming of Small Planet 3443 as the 3443 Leetsungdao (1997)
- New York City Science Award (1997)
- Pope Joannes Paulus Medal (1999)
- Ministero dell'Interno Medal of the Government of Italy (1999)
- New York Academy of Science Award (2000)
- The Order of the Rising Sun, Gold and Silver Star, Japan (2007)
- Marcel Grossmann Awards (2015), "for his work on white dwarfs motivating Enrico Fermi’s return to astrophysics and guiding the basic understanding of neutron star matter and fields"

Memberships

- National Academy of Sciences
- American Academy of Arts and Sciences
- American Philosophical Society
- Academia Sinica
- Accademia Nazionale dei Lincei
- Chinese Academy of Sciences
- Third World Academy of Sciences
- Pontifical Academy of Sciences

== Selected publications ==
Technical reports

- "Conservation Laws in Weak Interactions," Columbia University, United States Department of Energy (through predecessor agency the Atomic Energy Commission, March 1957).
- "Weak Interactions," Columbia University, United States Department of Energy (through predecessor agency the Atomic Energy Commission, June 1957).
- (with C.N. Yang) "Elementary Particles and Weak Interactions," Brookhaven National Laboratory, United States Department of Energy (through predecessor agency the Atomic Energy Commission, October 1957).
- "History of Weak Interactions," Columbia University, United States Department of Energy (through predecessor agency the Atomic Energy Commission), July 1970).
- "High Energy Electromagnetic and Weak Interaction Processes," Brookhaven National Laboratory, United States Department of Energy (through predecessor agency the Atomic Energy Commission, January 11, 1972).

Books

- Lee, T.D. (1981). Particle Physics and Introduction to Field Theory. Newark: Harwood Academic Publishers. ISBN 978-3-7186-0032-8.
- Lee, T.D.; Feinberg, G. (1986). Selected Papers, Vols 13. Boston; Basel; Stuttgart: Birkhäuser. ISBN 978-0-8176-3344-8.
- Lee, T.D. (1988). Ed. R. Novick: Thirty Year's Since Parity Nonconservation. Boston; Basel; Stuttgart: Birkhäuser. ISBN 978-0-8176-3375-2.
- Lee, T.D. (1988). Symmetries, Asymmetries, and the World of Particles. Seattle: University of Washington Press. ISBN 978-0-295-96519-2.
- Lee, T.D.; Ren, H. C.; Pang, Y. (1998). Selected Papers, 1985-1996. Amsterdam: Gordon and Breach. ISBN 978-90-5699-609-3.
- Lee, T.D. (2000). Science and Art. Shanghai: Shanghai Scientific and Technical Publisher. ISBN 978-7-5323-5609-6.
- Lee, T.D. (2002). The Challenge from Physics. Beijing: China Economics Publisher. ISBN 978-7-5017-5622-3.
- Lee, T.D.; Cheng, Ji; Huaizu, Liu; Li, Teng (2004). Response to the Dispute of Discovery of Parity Violation (in Chinese). Lanzhou, Gansu: Gansu Science and Technology Publishing House. ISBN 978-7-5424-0929-4.

== See also ==
- Zhejiang Institute of Modern Physics
- Chinese people in New York City
