= Pheasant Lane Mall =

Shopping mall in Nashua, New Hampshire, United States

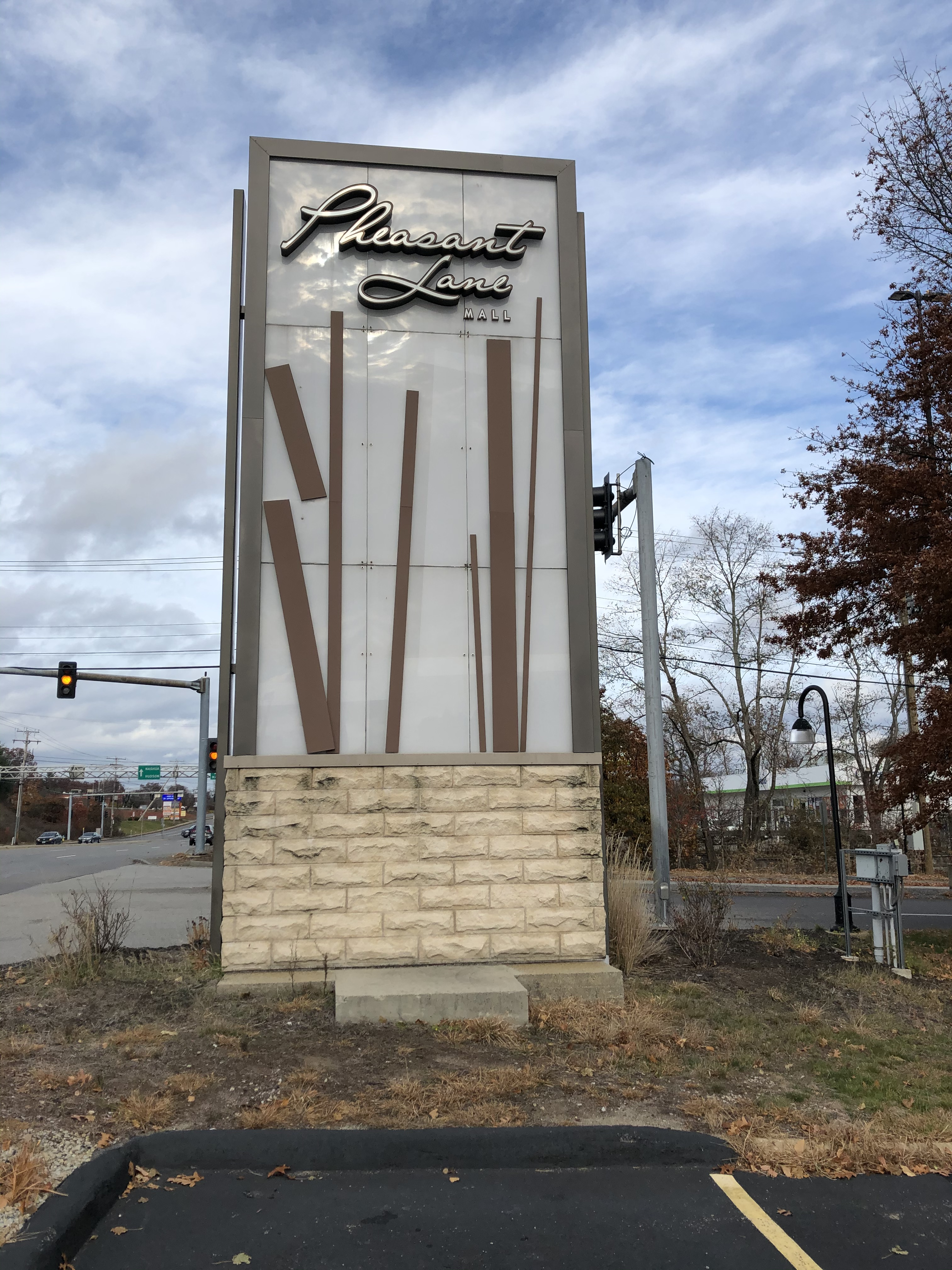
- Sign for Pheasant Lane Mall on Daniel Webster Highway, November 2020
- Location: Nashua, New Hampshire, United States
- Coordinates: 42°42′06″N 71°26′15″W
- Address: 310 Daniel Webster Highway
- Opened: July 23, 1986; 40 years ago
- Manager: Simon Property Group
- Owner: Simon Property Group
- Num. of stores: 139
- Num. of anchor tenants: 5
- Floor area: 979,427 square feet (90,992 m^{2})
- Floors: 2
- Public transit: NTS 6
- Website: www.simon.com/mall/pheasant-lane-mall

Pheasant Lane Mall is a shopping mall in south Nashua, New Hampshire. With a floor area 979,427 square feet (90,992 m^{2}), it is the second-largest mall in the state. Located just south of Exit 1 of the F.E. Everett Turnpike (US Route 3) in Nashua and directly at northbound exit-only Exit 91 off US 3 in Tyngsborough, Massachusetts, the property straddles the state line, although the entire mall is in New Hampshire.

As of 2026, the mall has about 139 stores and kiosks, including four anchor stores: Dick's Sporting Goods, JCPenney, Macy's, and Target; The Nash, a casino that opened in March 2025 in the space formerly occupied by a Sears store; and 15 restaurants. Since 2012 it has been owned and managed by Simon Property Group of Indianapolis.

The mall's location, right across the state border, has long drawn shoppers from Massachusetts seeking to take advantage of New Hampshire's lack of a sales tax.

Approximately one third of the parking lot and water runoff area is located in Tyngsborough. Shoppers who park in front of the former Sears entrance closer to Buffalo Wild Wings walk across the state line in front of the building on the sidewalk to get to and from their cars. The JCPenney store was originally built with a square corner that reached slightly across the border into Massachusetts, but was then modified to an unusual pentagonal shape at the state line to keep it entirely within New Hampshire by a few inches. Without that modification, the entire mall would have been subject to Massachusetts sales taxes on non-clothing items, even though only a few inches of the structure was in Massachusetts.

== History ==
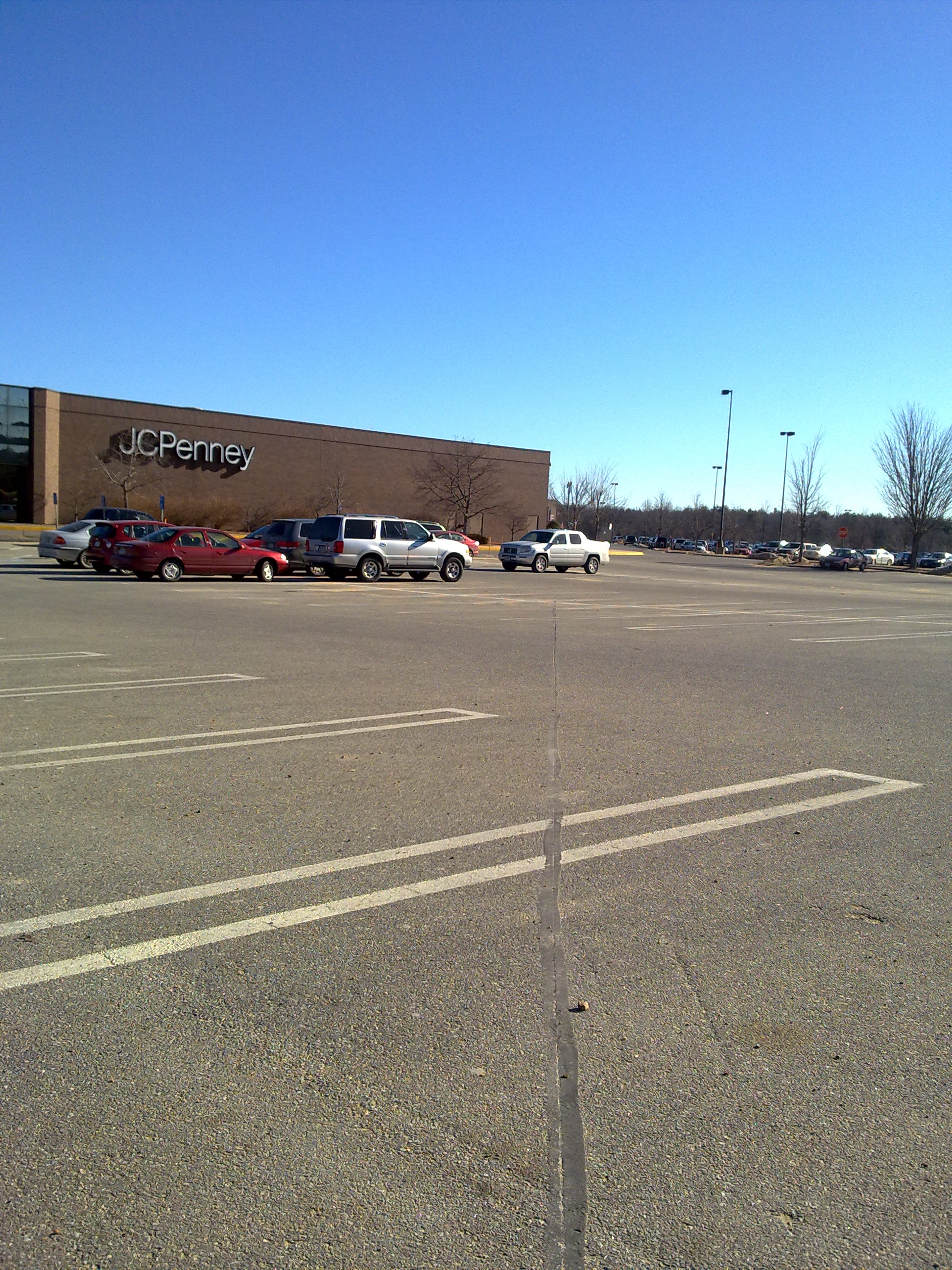
The state line runs through the parking lot, with JCPenney ending at the line (New Hampshire on the left, Mass. on the right). The truck in the background is parked in both states.

The mall site was first re-zoned by the Nashua Board of Aldermen in December 1978 with the intention of clearing the way for primary owners Yankee Greyhound Inc. to build a major regional retail center on the site. By early 1984, the property was owned by State Properties of New England, previously a minority owner; ground work had been started and steel had been ordered. After more than two years of construction, Pheasant Lane Mall opened on July 23, 1986. The original anchors were JCPenney, Jordan Marsh, Lechmere, and Sears with Filene's added in 1993. The site was previously a drive-in movie theatre, and for several years following its opening, the former movie screen was used to display the double pheasant logo of the mall.

The resulting mall development transformed South Nashua. It turned the southeastern portion of the city, roughly conforming to the city's 8th ward, from a sparsely populated outlier area into a swath of financial, retail and high-density residential development that stretches from over the state border in Tyngsborough, Massachusetts, to Exit 3 of the Everett Turnpike, just south of Rivier College. The rise of South Nashua spurred by Pheasant Lane Mall has elevated Nashua's municipal identity beyond gateway to New Hampshire, and helped create its current status as part of the Greater Boston economic area, and a hub for surrounding bedroom communities.

== Border proximity ==
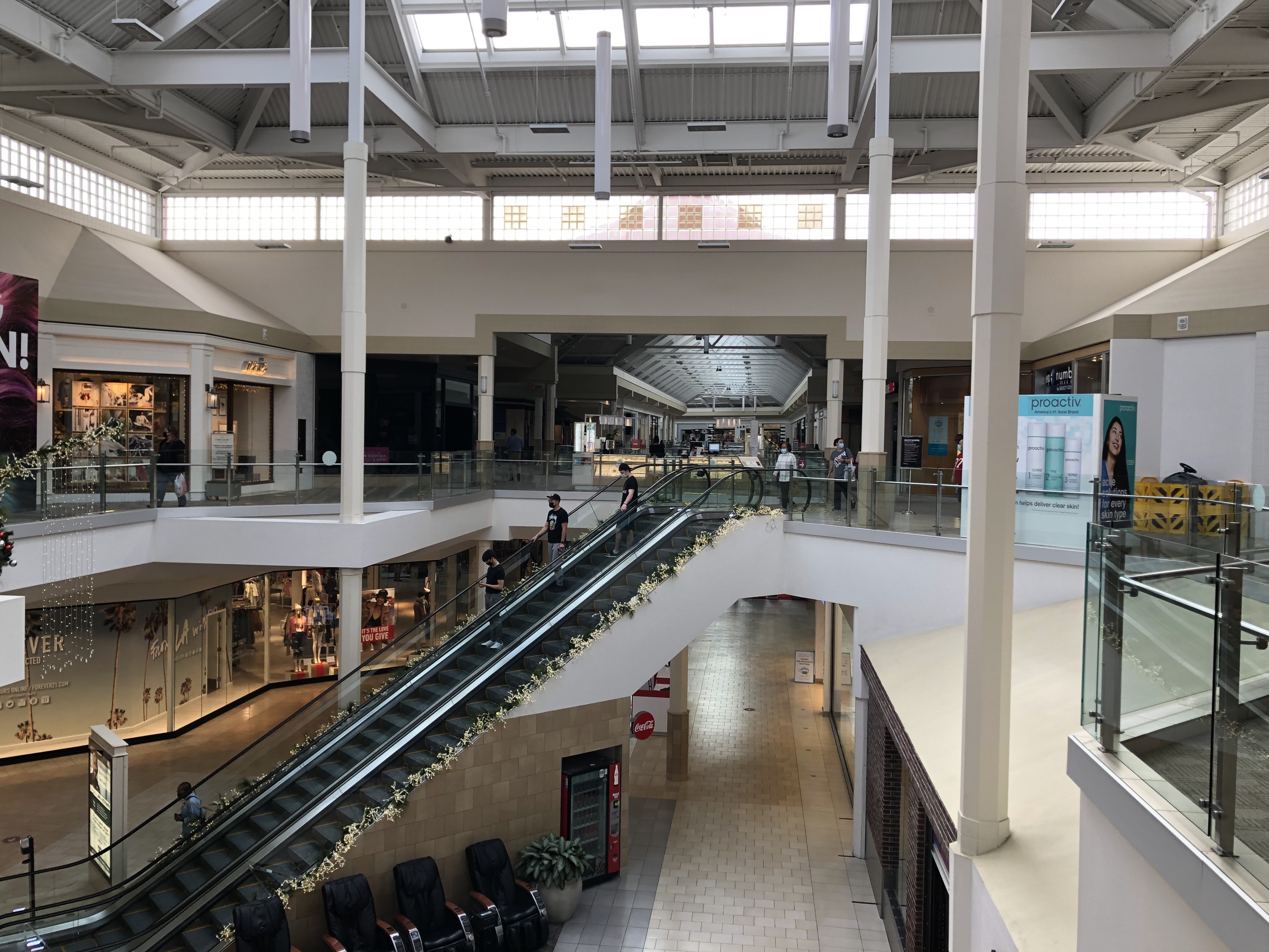
Interior of the mall near the north end

Originally, the mall was to straddle the border between New Hampshire and Massachusetts. The initial plan called for retail stores to be situated on the New Hampshire side, to take advantage of the state's lack of a sales tax. Restaurants were to be on the Massachusetts side, since taxes on food would be lower in Massachusetts (5% sales tax in 1986, 6.25% in 2025) than in New Hampshire (8.5% prepared meals tax).

However, the government of Massachusetts declared all customers, in all stores, would have to pay sales tax to Massachusetts. Therefore, the mall was redesigned so that all stores and restaurants were on the New Hampshire side of the border.

However, the site lines had been drawn up incorrectly, placing one corner of the JCPenney building in Massachusetts. Consequently, the corner of JCPenney was cut off and re-bricked into its current pentagonal shape.

== See also ==
- Nashua Transit System
