= Kinoshita–Lee–Nauenberg theorem =

Theorem in quantum mechanics

The Kinoshita–Lee–Nauenberg theorem or KLN theorem states that perturbatively the Standard Model as a whole is infrared (IR) finite. That is, the infrared divergences coming from loop integrals are canceled by IR divergences coming from phase space integrals. It was introduced independently by Toichiro Kinoshita (1962) and Tsung-Dao Lee and Michael Nauenberg (1964).

An analogous result for quantum electrodynamics alone is known as Bloch–Nordsieck theorem.

Ultraviolet divergences in perturbative quantum field theory are dealt with in renormalization.
