= Yang Chen-Ning =

Chinese-American physicist (1922–2025)

- 楊振寧
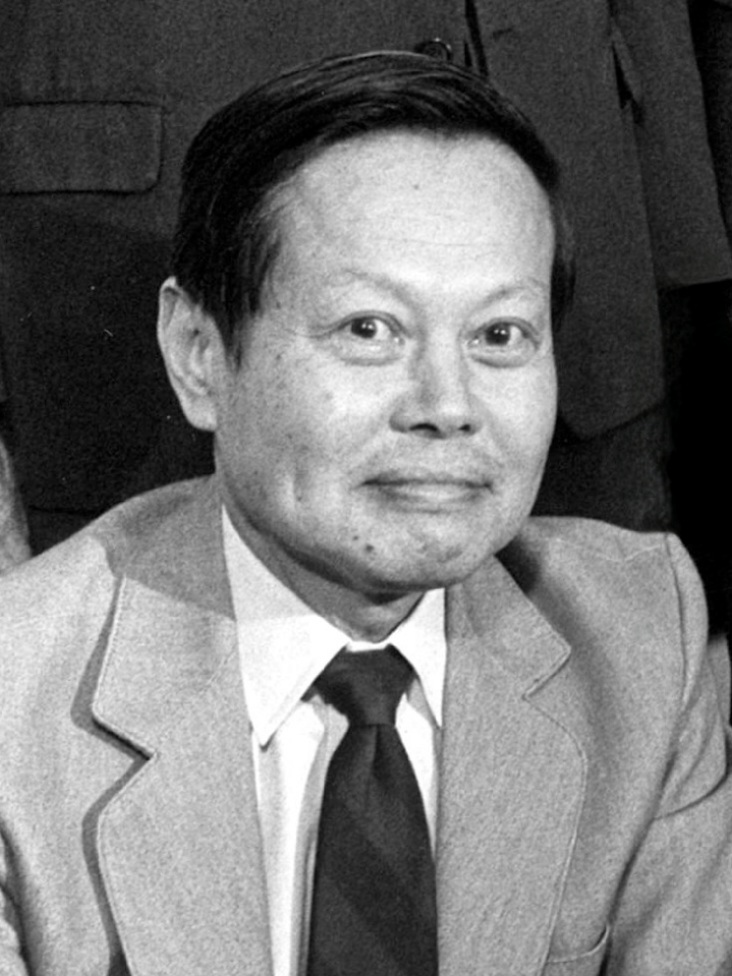
- Yang in 1976
- Born: October 1, 1922; Hefei, Anhui, China
- Died: October 18, 2025 (aged 103); Beijing, People's Republic of China
- Citizenship: Republic of China (1922‍–‍2015); United States (1964–2015); China (2015–2025)
- Education: National Southwestern Associated University (BS); National Tsing Hua University (MS); University of Chicago (PhD)
- Known for: List: Yang–Baxter equation; Yang-Baxter operator; Yang–Mills theory; Byers-Yang theorem; Landau–Yang theorem; Lee–Yang theorem; Lee–Yang theory; Wu–Yang dictionary; Wu–Yang monopole; Fermi–Yang model; Off-diagonal long-range order; G-parity; Parity violation
- Spouses: Tu Chih-Li (杜致禮) (m. 1950; died 2003); Weng Fan (翁帆) (m. 2005)
- Children: 3
- Awards: List: Nobel Prize in Physics (1957); Guggenheim Fellowship (1962); Fritz London Memorial Lecture (1966); Rumford Prize (1980); National Medal of Science (1986); Oskar Klein Memorial Lecture (1988); ForMemRS (1992); Benjamin Franklin Medal (1993); Bower Award (1994); Albert Einstein Medal (1995); Bogolyubov Prize (1996); Lars Onsager Prize (1999); King Faisal Prize (2001)
- Scientific career
- Fields: Statistical mechanics; Particle physics; Condensed matter physics; Field theory
- Workplaces: Stony Brook University; Institute for Advanced Study; CUHK; Tsinghua University; University of Chicago; Chern Institute of Mathematics
- Thesis: On the Angular Distribution in Nuclear Reactions and Coincidence Measurements (1948)
- Doctoral advisor: Edward Teller
- Other academic advisors: Enrico Fermi
- Doctoral students: Bill Sutherland (1968); Brosl Hasslacher (1972); Alexander Wu Chao (1974)

Chinese name
- Simplified Chinese: 杨振宁
- Traditional Chinese: 楊振寧
Transcriptions
Standard Mandarin
- Hanyu Pinyin: Yáng Zhènníng
- Wade–Giles: Yang^{2} Chên^{4}-ning^{2}
- IPA: [jǎŋ ʈʂə̂n.nǐŋ]

Signature
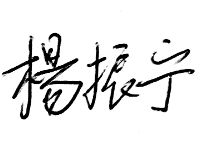

Yang Chen-Ning (simplified Chinese: 杨振宁; traditional Chinese: 楊振寧; pinyin: Yáng Zhènníng; October 1, 1922 – October 18, 2025) also known as C.N. Yang and Franklin Yang, was a Chinese-American theoretical physicist who made significant contributions to statistical mechanics, integrable systems, gauge theory, particle physics and condensed matter physics.

Yang is known for his collaboration with Robert Mills in 1954 in developing non-abelian gauge theory, widely known as the Yang–Mills theory, which describes the nuclear forces in the Standard Model of particle physics.

Yang and Tsung-Dao Lee received the 1957 Nobel Prize in Physics for their work on parity non-conservation of the weak interaction, which was confirmed by the Wu experiment in 1956. The two proposed that the conservation of parity, a physical law observed to hold in all other physical processes, is violated in weak nuclear reactions – those nuclear processes that result in the emission of beta particles.

== Early life and education ==
Yang was born in Hefei, Anhui, China, on October 1, 1922. His mother was Luo Meng-hua and his father, Ko-Chuen Yang (楊克純; 1896–1973), was a mathematician.

Yang attended elementary school and high school in Beiping (now Beijing), and in the autumn of 1937 his family moved to Hefei after the Japanese invaded China. In 1938 they moved to Kunming, Yunnan, where National Southwestern Associated University was located. In the same year, as a second-year student, Yang passed the entrance examination and studied at National Southwestern Associated University. He received a Bachelor of Science in 1942, with his thesis on the application of group theory to molecular spectra, under the supervision of Ta-You Wu.

Yang continued to study graduate courses there for two years under the supervision of Wang Zhuxi (J.S. Wang), working on statistical mechanics. In 1944, he received a Master of Science from National Tsing Hua University, which had moved to Kunming during the Sino-Japanese War (1937–1945). Yang was then awarded a scholarship from the Boxer Indemnity Scholarship Program, set up by the United States government using part of the money China had been forced to pay following the Boxer Rebellion. His departure for the United States was delayed for one year, during which time he taught in a middle school as a teacher and studied field theory.

Yang entered the University of Chicago in January 1946 and studied with Edward Teller. He received a Doctor of Philosophy in 1948.

== Career ==
Yang remained at the University of Chicago for a year as an assistant to Enrico Fermi. In 1949 he was invited to do his research at the Institute for Advanced Study in Princeton, New Jersey, where he began a period of fruitful collaboration with Tsung-Dao Lee. Lee and Yang published 32 papers together. He was made a permanent member of the Institute in 1952, and full professor in 1955. In 1963, Princeton University Press published his textbook, Elementary Particles. In 1965 he moved to Stony Brook University, where he was named the Albert Einstein Professor of Physics and the first director of the newly founded Institute for Theoretical Physics. Today this institute is known as the C. N. Yang Institute for Theoretical Physics. Yang retired from Stony Brook University in 1999.

Yang visited mainland China in 1971 for the first time after the thaw in China–US relations, and subsequently worked to help the Chinese physics community rebuild the research atmosphere, which later eroded due to political movements during the Cultural Revolution. After retiring from Stony Brook, he returned to Beijing as an honorary director of Tsinghua University, where he was the first Huang Jibei-Lu Kaiqun Professor at the Center for Advanced Study (CASTU). He was also one of the two Shaw Prize Founding Members and was a Distinguished Professor-at-Large at the Chinese University of Hong Kong.

Yang helped to establish the Theoretical Physics Division at the Chern Institute of Mathematics in 1986 at the request of Shiing-Shen Chern who was serving as the inaugural director of the Institute at the time.

== Personal life and death ==
Yang married Tu Chih-li (traditional Chinese: 杜致禮; simplified Chinese: 杜致礼; pinyin: Dù Zhìlǐ), a teacher, in 1950; they had two sons and a daughter together. His father-in-law was the Kuomintang general Du Yuming. Tu died in October 2003. In January 2005, Yang married Weng Fan (Chinese: 翁帆; pinyin: Wēng Fān), a university student. They met in 1995 at a physics seminar; the couple reestablished contact in February 2004 when Yang moved to China to become affiliated with Tsinghua University. Yang called Weng, who was 54 years his junior, his "final blessing from God".

Yang obtained U.S. citizenship during his research within the country. According to the state-run Xinhua News Agency, Yang said the decision was painful as his father never forgave him for that. According to Xinhua and other mainstream Chinese media, he formally renounced his American citizenship on April 1, 2015. He acknowledged that while the U.S. was a beautiful country that gave him good opportunities to study science, China since his youth had offered the best secondary and undergraduate institutions, though the US had the top graduate studies. However, circumstances changed in favor of China's growth by the turn of the century.

His son Guangnuo was a computer scientist. His second son Guangyu is an astronomer, and his daughter Youli is a doctor.

Yang turned 100 on October 1, 2022, and died in Beijing on October 18, 2025, at the age of 103. The day after the announcement of his death, people gathered and waited in line at Tsinghua University to pay tributes to Yang.

== Views on the CEPC ==
Yang is known for having opposed the construction of the Circular Electron Positron Collider (CEPC), a 100 km circumference particle collider in China that would study the Higgs boson. He catalogued the project as "guess" work and without guaranteed results. Yang said that "even if they see something with the machine, it's not going to benefit the life of Chinese people any sooner."

== Academic achievements ==
Yang worked on statistical mechanics, condensed matter theory, particle physics and gauge theory/quantum field theory.

Various Nobel Prizes in Physics are based on Yang's work. At least 10 Nobel laureates in Physics cited Yang's work during their Nobel speech, this includes: Steven Weinberg (1979), Sheldon Glashow (1979), Martinus J. G. Veltman (1999), Gerard 't Hooft (1999), David Gross (1999), Yoichiro Nambu (2008), Makoto Kobayashi (2008), Toshihide Maskawa (2008), François Englert (2013) and Peter Higgs (2013).

=== Early contributions ===
His first two papers (1944, 1945) were the result of his master thesis on statistical physics, supervised by J. S. Wang.

At the University of Chicago, Yang first spent twenty months working in an accelerator lab, but found he was not good at experimental physics and switched back to theory. His doctoral thesis was about an atomic beam apparatus for measuring the nuclear quadrupole resonance of sodium.

Later, Yang worked on particle phenomenology; a well-known work was the Fermi–Yang model of 1949, treating the pion as a bound nucleon–antinucleon pair.

=== Main contributions ===
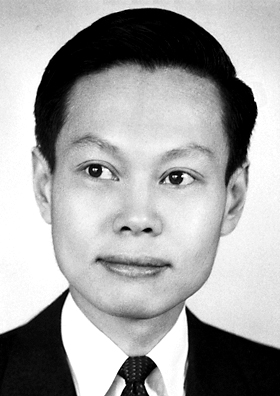
Yang in 1957

Yang is well known for his 1953 collaboration with Robert Mills in developing non-abelian gauge theory, widely known as the Yang–Mills theory. The idea was generally conceived by Yang while the novice scientist Mills assisted him as Mills explained:

During the academic year 1953–54, Yang was a visitor to Brookhaven National Laboratory ... I was at Brookhaven also ... and was assigned to the same office as Yang. Yang, who demonstrated on a number of occasions his generosity to physicists beginning their careers, told me about his idea of generalizing gauge invariance and we discussed it at some length ... I was able to contribute something to the discussions, especially with regard to the quantization procedures, and to a small degree in working out the formalism; however, the key ideas were Yang's.

The Scientist called Yang–Mills theory:

The foundation for the current understanding of how subatomic particles interact is a contribution which has restructured modern physics and mathematics.

In 1956, he and T. D. Lee analyzed a problem known as the τ–θ puzzle, in which a particle called θ decayed into two pions and a particle τ into three pions, the two decays with different parity symmetry. However the two particles were not distinguishable. Lee and Yang proposed that, in the weak interaction, parity symmetry was not conserved and that it was the same particle (now known as the kaon K^{+}). To test if weak interaction conserved parity, Lee contacted Chien-Shiung Wu's team at the National Bureau of Standards in Washington. Wu experiment experimentally verified the theory and the results were announced early in a press conference. The results were also confirmed by two other independent experiments by Valentine Telegdi and Jerome Isaac Friedman at the University of Chicago and by Richard Garwin and Leon M. Lederman at Columbia University. All three experiments published their results in early 1957. That year, Yang and Lee received the 1957 Nobel Prize in Physics for this parity violation theory, which brought revolutionary change to the field of particle physics.

In the 1970s, Yang worked on the topological properties of gauge theory, collaborating with Tai Tsun Wu to elucidate the Wu–Yang monopole, a type of magnetic monopole. Unlike the Dirac monopole, it has no singular Dirac string. Their 1975 paper, known as the Wu–Yang dictionary, helped bridge gaps between physics and differential geometry.

On Yang's retirement from SUNY in 1999, Freeman Dyson called Yang "the pre-eminent stylist" of 20th-century physics alongside Albert Einstein and Paul Dirac, citing how Yang "turns his least important calculations into miniature works of art, and turns his deeper speculations into masterpieces." In 2009, Dyson wrote:

Yang took [Hermann] Weyl's place as the leading bird among my generation of physicists ... With non-Abelian gauge fields generating nontrivial Lie algebras, the possible forms of interaction between fields become unique, so that symmetry dictates interaction. This idea is Yang's greatest contribution to physics. It is a contribution of a bird flying high over the rain forest of little problems in which most of us spend our lives.

=== 13 seminal contributions ===
In 2012, there were celebrations for Yang's 90th birthday. The Chinese University of Hong Kong hosted a scientific conference and dinner banquet to announce the creation of the CN Yang archive. Physicist Kenneth Young opened the ceremony. Yang also received a black cube from Tsinghua University with 13 of his seminal contributions engraved on the faces of the cube. On the cube is also written "Congratulations on Professor Chen Ning Yang's 90th birthday" in Chinese. The cube also includes an ancient Chinese poem used by Yang in his 2013 Selected Papers and Commentaries; it reads:

A piece of literature
Is meant for the millennium
But its ups and downs are known
Already in the author's heart

— Du Fu

The 13 contributions engraved on the cube are:

- Statistical mechanics:
  - Phase transitions (1952): for his works with Lee on the Lee–Yang theory and the Lee–Yang theorem, which describe the liquid-gas phase transition based on microscopic properties.
  - Bosons (1957): for Lee–Huang–Yang correction for a weakly interacting Bose gas, in collaboration with Lee and Kerson Huang. It explains the stability of Bose–Einstein condensates and superfluids.
  - Yang–Baxter equation (1967): consistent condition for a one-dimensional factorized scattering many-body system, which resurrected the interest in the Bethe ansatz and allowed to better description of 1D fermions.
  - Finite temperature (1969): for the Yang–Yang thermodynamics formalism for 1D bosons, in collaboration with his brother Chen-Ping Yang (1930–2018). The predictions of this formalism where demonstrated in 2008 using ultracold atoms.
- Condensed matter physics:
  - Flux quantization (1961): for Byers–Yang theorem in superconductors, in collaboration with Nina Byers. They showed that the magnetic flux trapped in a superconducting ring is given by half of the usual magnetic flux quantum.
  - ODLRO (1962): for his development of the concept of off-diagonal long-range order (ODLRO) that characterizes macroscopic quantum phenomena like superconductivity and superfluidity.
- Particle physics:
  - Parity non-conservation (1956): for predicting the violation of parity symmetry with Lee, for which they were awarded the Nobel Prize in Physics in 1957.
  - T, C, and P (1957): work on explaining the relation between parity (P), charge (C) and time-reversal (T) symmetries, now known as CPT symmetry. Done in collaboration with Lee and Reinhard Oehme.
  - Neutrino experiment (1960): for the Lee and Yang paper that proposed to study the weak interaction with high energy neutrinos. This work promoted various neutrino experiments.
  - CP nonconservation (1964): for his paper on CP violation, in collaboration with T. T. Wu.
- Field theory:
  - Gauge theory (1954): for Yang–Mills theory, in collaboration with Robert Mills.
  - Integral formalism (1974): for giving meaning to the nonintegral phase factor in gauge theories.
  - Fiber bundle (1975): for the Wu–Yang dictionary, in collaboration with T. T. Wu.

== Awards and honors ==
Yang was elected a Fellow of the American Physical Society in 1955, the first foreign-to-domestic member of the Chinese Academy of Sciences, the Academia Sinica in 1958, the Russian Academy of Sciences, and the Royal Society. He was an elected member of the American Academy of Arts and Sciences, the American Philosophical Society, and the United States National Academy of Sciences. He was awarde Princeton University (1958), Moscow State University (1992), and the Chinese University of Hong Kong (1997).

=== List of awards ===
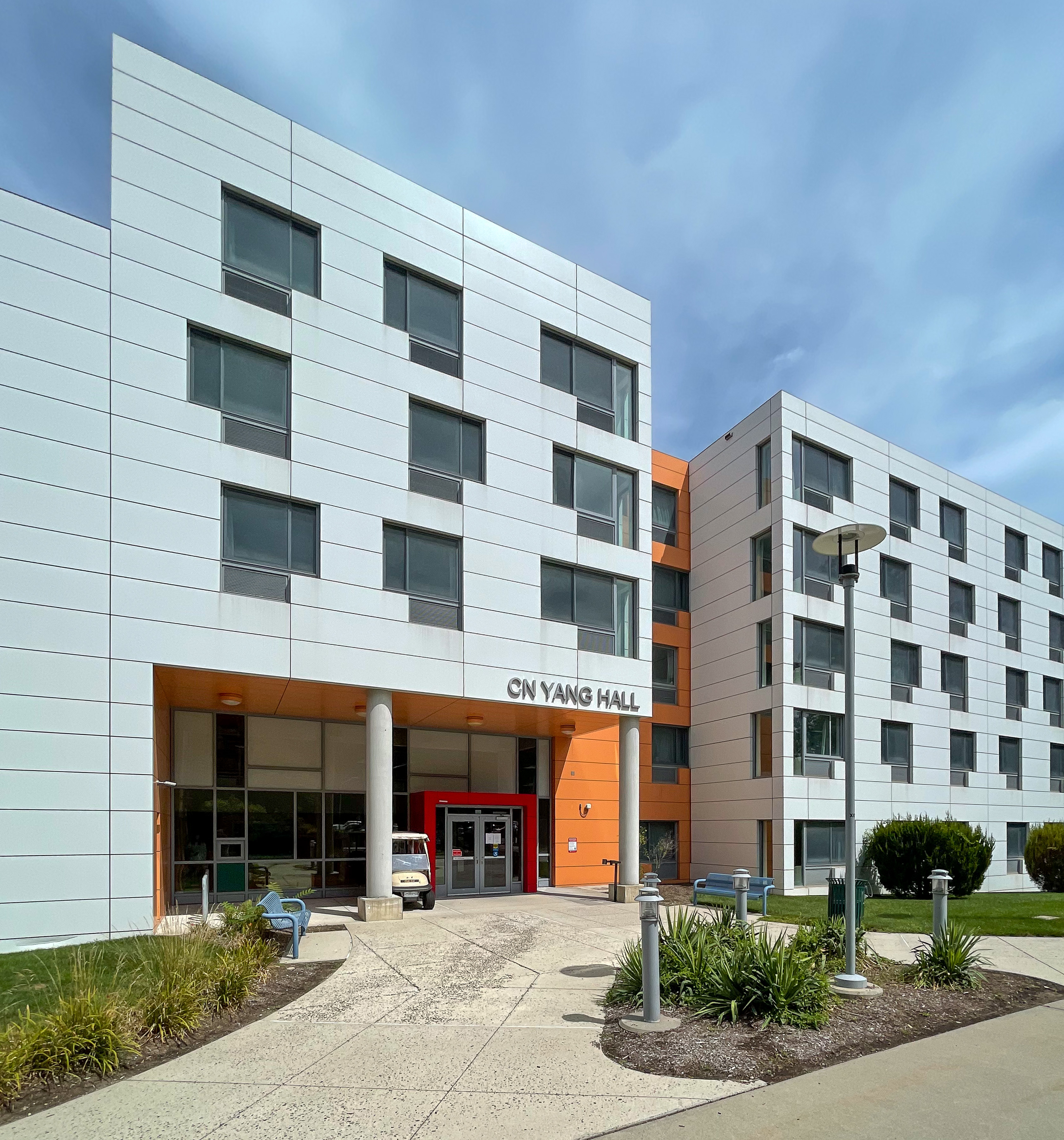
C. N. Yang Hall at Stony Brook University

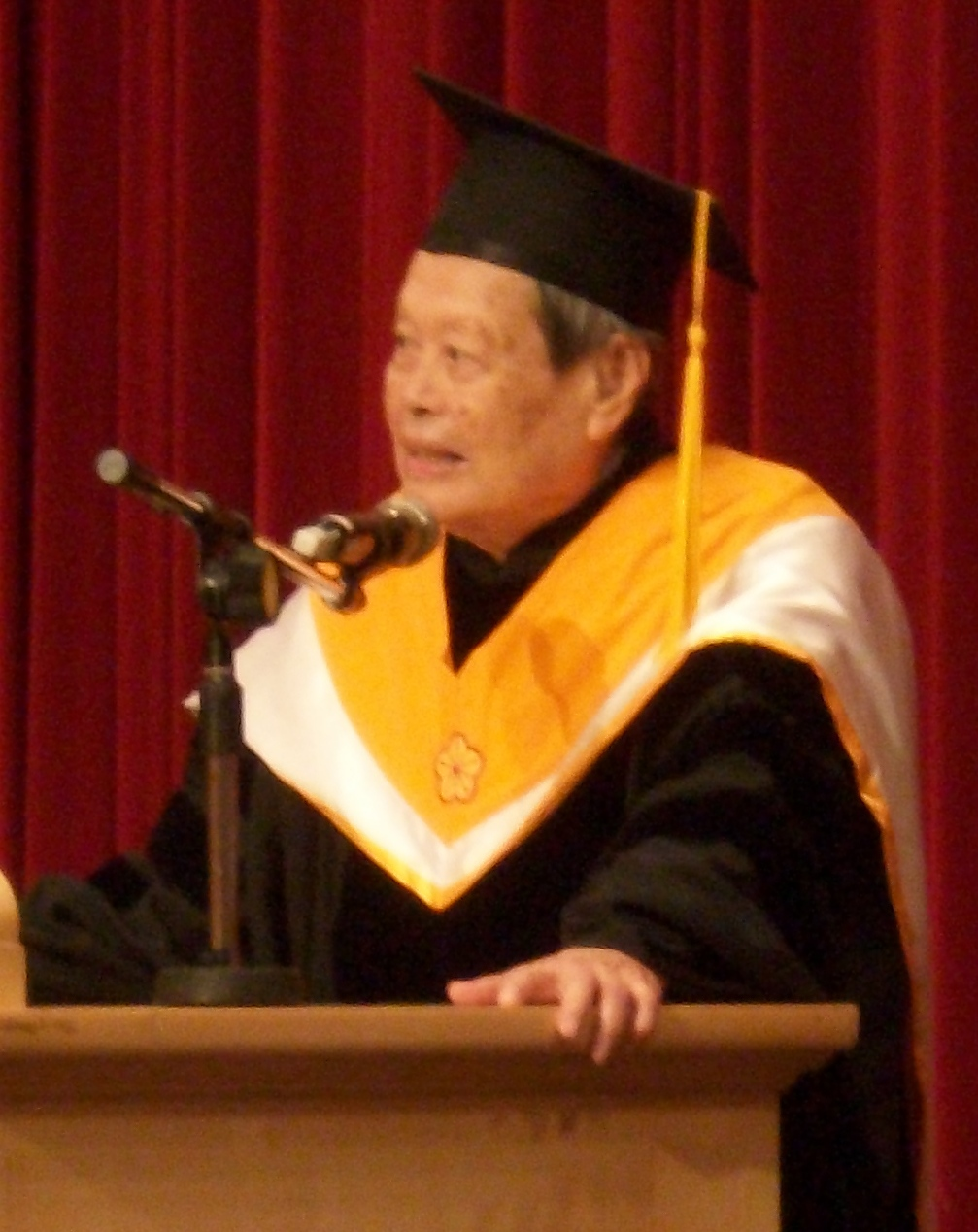
Yang at National Taiwan University in 2010

- Ten Outstanding Young Americans (1957)
- Nobel Prize in Physics (1957) with T. D. Lee.
- Rumford Prize (1980), with Robert Mills.
- National Medal of Science (1986)
- First laureate of the Oskar Klein Memorial Lecture and Medal (1988)
- Benjamin Franklin Medal for Distinguished Achievement in the Sciences of the American Philosophical Society (1993)
- Bower Award (1994)
- Albert Einstein Medal (1995)
- Lars Onsager Prize (1999)
- King Faisal International Prize (2001)
- Marcel Grossmann Awards (2015), "for deepening Einstein's geometrical approach to physics in the best tradition of Paul Dirac and Hermann Weyl"
- Asian Scientist 100, Asian Scientist (2016 and 2020)

=== Awards and places named after him ===
Yang was the first president of the Association of Asia Pacific Physical Societies (AAPPS) when it was established in 1989. In 1997, the AAPPS created the C. N. Yang Award in his honor to highlight young researchers.

In 1998, after his retirement, the Institute of Theoretical Physics of Stony Brook University was renamed C. N. Yang Institute for Theoretical Physics. The C. N. Yang Hall, a residence hall and activity center at Stony Brook University, was dedicated in 2010.

== Selected publications ==
- Yang, C. N. (1983). Selected Papers, 1945–1980, with Commentary. San Francisco, CA: W. H. Freeman & Co. ISBN 978-0-7167-1406-4.
  - Yang, Chen-Ning (2005) [1983]. Selected Papers, 1945–1980, with Commentary. World Scientific Series in 20th Century Physics. Vol. 36 (2005 ed.). Singapore: World Scientific. ISBN 981-256-367-9.
- Yang, Chen-Ning (2013). Selected Papers of Chen Ning Yang II: With Commentaries. Singapore: World Scientific. ISBN 978-981-4449-00-7.
- Yang, C. N.; Mills, R. L. (1954). "Conservation of Isotopic Spin and Isotopic Gauge Invariance". Physical Review. 96 (1): 191–195. Bibcode:1954PhRv...96..191Y. doi:10.1103/PhysRev.96.191.
- Mills, R. L.; Yang, C. N. (1966). "Treatment of Overlapping Divergences in the Photon Self-Energy Function". Progress of Theoretical Physics Supplement. 37: 507. Bibcode:1966PThPS..37..507M. doi:10.1143/PTPS.37.507.
- Yang, C. N. (2005). "Remembering Robert Mills". In 't Hooft, Gerardus (ed.). 50 years of Yang-Mills theory. Singapore: World Scientific. ISBN 978-981-238-934-3.
- Lee, T. D.; Yang, C. N. (1956). "Question of Parity Conservation in Weak Interactions". Physical Review. 104 (1): 254–258. Bibcode:1956PhRv..104..254L. doi:10.1103/PhysRev.104.254. S2CID 2044624.
- Lee, T. D.; Yang, C. N. (1952). "Statistical Theory of Equations of State and Phase Transitions. II. Lattice Gas and Ising Model". Physical Review. 87 (3): 410–419. Bibcode:1952PhRv...87..410L. doi:10.1103/PhysRev.87.410. ISSN 0031-9007.
- Byers, N.; Yang, C. N. (1961). "Theoretical Considerations Concerning Quantized Magnetic Flux in Superconducting Cylinders". Physical Review Letters. 7 (2): 46–49. Bibcode:1961PhRvL...7...46B. doi:10.1103/PhysRevLett.7.46.

== See also ==
- List of Chinese Nobel laureates
- List of theoretical physicists
