= Nina Byers =

American physicist

- Born: January 19, 1930
- Died: June 5, 2014 (aged 84)
- Education: University of California, Berkeley; University of Chicago
- Known for: Byers–Yang theorem
- Scientific career
- Fields: Physics

Nina Byers (January 19, 1930 – June 5, 2014) was a theoretical physicist, research professor and professor of physics emeritus in the department of physics and astronomy, UCLA, and Fellow of Somerville College, Oxford. She is known for proving the Byers–Yang theorem, together with C.N. Yang.

== Contributions ==
Byers received a B.A. from the University of California, Berkeley in 1950 and a Ph.D. from the University of Chicago in 1956.

Byers made phenomenological analyses of experimental observations leading to theoretical advances in particle physics and the theory of superconductivity. In "Theoretical considerations concerning quantized magnetic flux in superconductors," she showed that observation of flux quantization in superconductors in units of hc/2e is experimental evidence for the Cooper pairing of electrons proposed by the BCS theory of superconductivity (Byers-Yang theorem).

In addition to scientific papers, Byers published papers and edited a book on original and important contributions to modern physics by 20th century female physicists. She developed the website Contributions of 20th Century Women to Physics (CWP website), which documents original and important contributions to physics by over 80 female physicists of the 20th century. With Gary Williams, she edited a book based on data from the website that expands the biographies and describes more fully the scientific contributions of forty distinguished 20th century female physicists.

Byers was elected to many offices in The American Physical Society (APS) and American Association for the Advancement of Science (AAAS), including President of the APS Forum on History of Physics (2004–2005), APS Forum on Physics and Society (1982), and APS Councilor-at-large of the Society (1977–81).

== Works ==
=== Selected scientific publications ===
- Byers, N.; Yang, C. N. (July 1961). "Theoretical Considerations Concerning Quantized Magnetic Flux in Superconducting Cylinders". Physical Review Letters. 7 (2): 46–49. Bibcode:1961PhRvL...7...46B. doi:10.1103/PhysRevLett.7.46.
- McClary, Richard; Byers, Nina (October 1983). "Relativistic effects in heavy-quarkonium spectroscopy". Physical Review D. 28 (7): 1692–1705. Bibcode:1983PhRvD..28.1692M. doi:10.1103/PhysRevD.28.1692.
- Nina Byers, "Einstein and Women", APS News Jun 2005.
- Nina Byers, "Physicists and the 1945 Decision to Drop The Bomb", CERN Courier Oct 2002. (e-Print Archive: physics/0210058)
- Nina Byers, "Fermi and Szilard" in ed. James Cronin (ed) Fermi Remembered, U. of Chicago Press 2004 (e-Print Archive: physics/0207094)
- Nina Byers, "E. Noether's Discovery of the Deep Connection Between Symmetries and Conservation Laws" Invited talk in Symposium on the Heritage of Emmy Noether, Ramat-Gan, Israel, 2–4 Dec 1996. Israel Mathematical Conference Proceedings Vol. 12, 1999 (e-Print Archive: physics/9807044)

=== Book ===
- Byers, Nina; Williams, Gary, eds. (2010). Out of the Shadows: Contributions of Twentieth-Century Women to Physics. Cambridge: Cambridge University Press. ISBN 9780521169622.
