= Nashua Transit System =

Public transportation authority for Nashua, New Hampshire

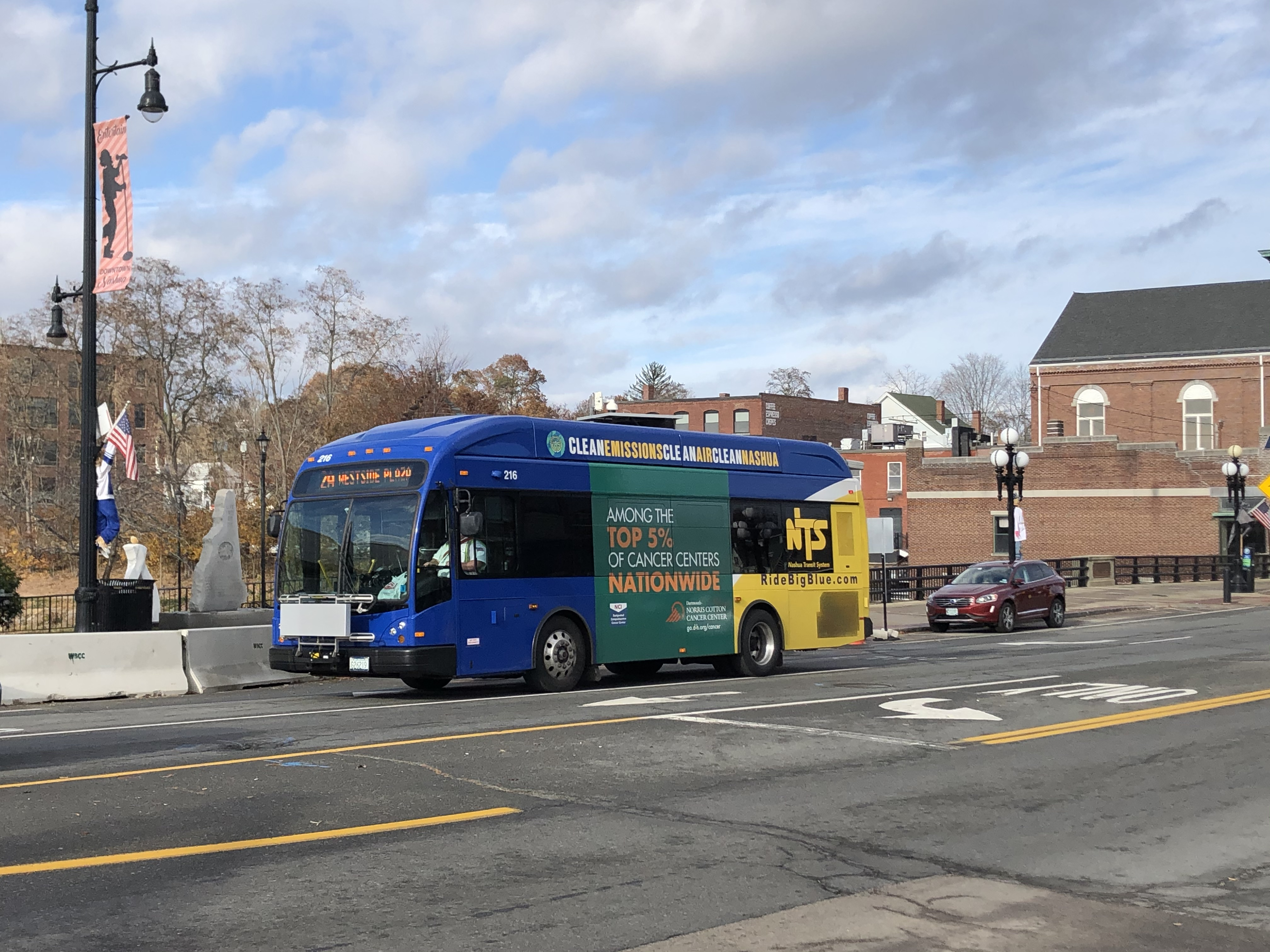
- Nashua Transit bus on Main Street, Nov. 2020
- Founded: Trolley service: 1895; Bus service: 1931, 1985 (current service)
- Headquarters: 11 Riverside St.
- Locale: Nashua, NH
- Service area: Urban area
- Service type: Bus service, paratransit
- Routes: 10
- Hubs: Elm St. Bus Station (Nashua Transit Center)
- Fuel type: Diesel, CNG
- Website: www.ridebigblue.com

Nashua Transit System provides public transit services for the city of Nashua, New Hampshire, located just on the outskirts of suburban Boston. NTS, also known as CityBus, provides eleven scheduled bus routes to major city destinations, and Citylift operates the paratransit service. In 2004, Metro Magazine named NTS as "one of the 10 Most Improved Transit Systems" in the United States.

== CityBus routes ==
Routes run from 6:15 am to 7:00 pm Monday to Friday, and 9:30 am to 6:00 pm on Saturday with reduced service (Routes 3 & 5 do not run on Saturday)

Scheduled bus routes:

- 1 French Hill/Greeley Park
- 2 Amherst St./Dartmouth/Westside Plaza
- 2A Amherst St./Walmart/Westside Plaza
- 3 Canal St./Marketplace Plaza
- 5 Lake St.-Northeastern Blvd.
- 6/6A South End/Pheasant Lane Mall

(Also serves Rivier University )

- 7 Crown Hill/Spring St.
- 9 Nashua Mall/Pine Hill
- 12 Lake St./Harris Rd.

== Citylift ==
Citylift is a demand responsive transport system, providing shared rides to those with a disability under the Americans with Disabilities Act or who are more than 60 years old.

== After-7 service ==
Nashua Transit System provides passengers with three routes after normal business hours. These routes run from 7 pm to 11 pm, Monday to Friday, with limited service on Saturdays.

- Central: French Hill-Broad St.
- North: North End-Amherst St.
- South: South End-Pheasant Lane Mall

== See also ==
- Fares and passes
- Citylift and Senior Services
