= Wang Zhuxi =

Chinese physicist, philologist, and writer

Wang Zhuxi (Chinese: 王竹溪; Pinyin: Wáng Zhúxī; June 7, 1911 - January 30, 1983), also known as J. S. Wang, who had the given name Zhiqi (治淇) and the sobriquet Zhuxi, was a Chinese physicist, philologist, and writer.

== Biography ==
Wang was born in Gong'an County, Hubei Province. He graduated from the Department of Physics of Tsinghua University in 1933, and continued his postgraduate study in the university's graduate school. With government support, he went to study in the United Kingdom, where he obtained his doctorate degree from Cambridge University under the supervision of Ralph Fowler in 1938.

Upon his return to China, Wang taught statistical physics, thermodynamics, and quantum mechanics at the Department of Physics at Tsinghua. After 1952 he became a professor at Peking University, later serving as the vice president of the university.

In recognition of his advancements in the field of physics, he was elected as a founding member of the Chinese Academy of Sciences in 1955.

Wang authored several textbooks published by the Peking University Press, including "Thermodynamics" and "Introduction to Statistical Physics". He served as the director of the Terminology Committee of the Chinese Physics Society, and created many Chinese translations of new physics terms.

In the meantime he was devoted to studying philology, serving as an editor of the "New Chinese Dictionary by Division Heads" with 2,500,000 words. It simplified 214 division heads of the Kangxi Dictionary into only 56, and arranged over 50,000 Chinese characters by stroke orders from top to bottom and left to right, which was a convenient system for retrieval.

Many of Wang's students are prominent physicists, including Nobel laureate Chen-Ning Yang and former president of the Chinese Academy of Sciences Zhou Guangzhao. In 2003, a bronze bust of Wang was founded at the Peking University campus.

== Works ==
- Thermodynamics, 2nd Edition; Wang Z.X; Peking University Press 2005 ISBN 7-301-08495-1
- Statistical Physics, Wang Z. X., Peking University Press
- Special Functions, Wang Z. X., Guo D R, Singapore World Scientific Publishing C. 1989 ISBN 9971-5-0667-X
- New Chinese Dictionary by Division Heads, Wang Z.X.
