= National Technological University (United States) =

National Technological University (NTU), Fort Collins, Colorado, was founded in 1984 as a non-profit organization offering graduate courses via satellite and leading to a Master of Science (M.S.) degree. It was a collaborative effort among many major engineering and management colleges in the United States to meet the graduate and continuing education needs of "engineers, technical professionals and managers using advanced educational and telecommunications technology." Graduate and non-credit courses were sourced from a number of distinguished universities and were delivered through NTU to working technical professionals and managers at corporate and government sites across the United States and at international locations as well. NTU was accredited by the North Central Association of Colleges and Schools, The Higher Learning Commission

"There is widespread recognition of the growing need for engineers and the organizations that employ them to create a new engineering culture that encourages lifelong learning. ... The National Technological University (NTU) is an important example. NTU delivers classes from major engineering schools by satellite to working professionals in industry. NTU and Motorola University ... have been cited as U.S. 'best practices' in this field."

In 2002, NTU was sold to Sylvan Learning Systems and then folded into Walden University in 2004.

== History ==
The founder and president of National Technological University (NTU) was Dr. Lionel V. Baldwin. Dr. Baldwin had been the Dean of Engineering at Colorado State University for more than 20 years and was well-connected in both the academic world and the corporate world. "These connections provided an excellent springboard from which to launch the fledging institution."

Beginning in 1982, "major corporations and the United States Department of Defense funded a two-year planning process involving numerous consultants. Two of the major corporations were GE and IBM. These sponsors provided technical advice and met regularly to help shape the plan. By the fall of 1983, the decision to proceed was made. ... These efforts led to the incorporation of the National Technological University (NTU) in January 1984."

NTU’s vision statement was "simple and straightforward. ‘Enabling working professionals and managers to share premier educational resources globally via telecommunications.’"

NTU was governed by a Board of Trustees composed primarily of senior technical managers at major corporations and senior administrators at major colleges of engineering.

Students participated through the sponsorship of their employers, and these employers included "technology-based corporations and government agencies such as 'AT&T, IBM, 3M, Hewlett-Packard, Lucent Technologies, Motorola, Texas Instruments, Boeing, and the U.S. Departments of Defense and Energy' (National Technological University Corporation Business Plan, July 2, 1997)."

U.S. engineering educators were early adopters of telecommunications technologies for course delivery anytime and anywhere. Nell Eurich, in a 1985 study of education in the workplace, observed that engineering faculty were "light years" ahead of other academic disciplines in the use of technology to serve working adult learners.

Initially, NTU courses were delivered via videotape but within two years the content was broadcast by satellite on a single analog channel. "By 1985, NTU’s place as a technological leader was beginning to take shape. In that year it became the first university to offer educational services via a telecommunication satellite." An NTU innovation soon made it possible to broadcast two analog channels on the same transponder and a few years later (1991) NTU pioneered the transition on satellite networks from analog to digital video achieving a sixfold increase in channel capacity. "By 1992 ... NTU could state that it was the first university or broadcast network to convert its satellite network from analog video to compressed digital video, thus pushing the boundaries of what was possible in satellite transmission." "One of the pioneer virtual institutions, National Technological University (NTU), began in 1995 to use a digital channel on PanAmSat 2 to cover an area from New Zealand to Australia, Indonesia, Singapore, Malaysia, Thailand, much of China, South Korea, Japan, and Siberia."

In 1986, "Senator John Glenn, the former astronaut, gave the first commencement address at a most unusual graduation ceremony: for one student who received a master's degree from the newly formed National Technological University." That first NTU graduate was Michael Reiss, a software analyst at the Cambridge, Ohio, facility of NCR Corporation. In 1987, "Arthur C. Clarke, the pioneer science fiction writer who years ago envisioned teaching by satellite, gave the address to the six recipients of master's degrees." From the first commencement in 1986 until 2002, the number of graduates grew to a total of more than 1,750 from a large number of corporate, government, and community sites in North America and in Southeast Asia.

The number of participating universities steadily grew until more than 50 were offering courses through National Technological University (NTU). They included schools such as the University of Illinois, Georgia Tech, University of Massachusetts, University of California at Berkeley, University of Arizona College of Optical Sciences, North Carolina State University, Oklahoma State University, Northeastern University, Purdue University, University of Maryland, Southern Methodist University, and another 42 public and private accredited universities.

In the 1980s, satellite-delivered education was so expensive that individual universities could not or would not elect that option. But, they could join NTU, a relatively large consortium, and reduce the individual institution's cost to an affordable level. For almost 20 years the NTU model functioned extremely well for the schools, the students, and the corporate and government sponsors. But, by the turn of the century, the Internet was well-developed, virtually free, and universal. Individual universities could now establish their own individual networks, which is exactly what many of them did.

"The higher education environment had evolved and the NTU partners had initiated their own distance education programs, changing the fundamental nature of their relationships with NTU. As this environmental change unfolded, NTU was continually challenged to remain a financially viable, small, stand-alone university. As a result, Laureate Education, Inc. (then Sylvan Learning Systems) purchased the institution ..." The purchase was made in 2002 and two years later NTU was folded into a for-profit online university (Walden University) in Minneapolis.

== Organizational structure ==
Qualified students, who were sponsored by their employers, were admitted to NTU and then could register for courses from any of the participating universities. Thus they could work with a faculty adviser to build a program best fitting their individual needs by enrolling in courses from multiple universities. Each degree program was created, maintained and updated by a faculty committee from a range of member universities. Although each course was being taught on its home campus, it was selected by the faculty committee to be integrated into the NTU program with appropriate courses from other member schools. This approach offered NTU students a multi-university array of courses from which to select. When their Master's program was completed, they received their degree from National Technological University (NTU), even though their courses may have come from a half dozen different schools.

== Curriculum ==
National Technological University (NTU) was first accredited by the North Central Association of Colleges and Schools (NCA) in 1986. M.S. Degree programs included: Business Administration, Chemical Engineering, Computer Engineering, Computer Science, Electrical Engineering, Engineering Management, Environmental Systems Management, Information Systems, Management of Technology, Manufacturing Systems Engineering, Materials Science and Engineering, Mechanical Engineering, Microelectronics and Semiconductor Engineering, Optical Science, Project Management, Software Engineering, Systems Engineering, Telecommunications, and Special Majors Programs. "National Technological University has a reputation for strength in engineering education."

National Technological University (NTU) also broadcast a daily schedule of non-credit short courses enabling working technical professionals and managers to update their skills or acquire new ones required by rapidly changing technologies or new business developments. NTU produced some of these courses itself, sourced others from the member universities, and included a large number from individual faculty, consultants and training organizations. By 1998–99, almost 500 short courses were delivered to over 35,000 participants. In 2000, NTU acquired The Business Channel from PBS and dramatically enlarged the scope of its professional development offerings. NTU also organized and delivered nationwide teleconferences associated with national events such as Engineers Week when, in 1992, "The broadcast, called 'Discover Engineering,' was transmitted to more than 375 sites around the country and was viewed by at least 8,000 students, according to the organizers, the Massachusetts Institute of Technology, the National Technological University, the Hewlett-Packard Company and Motorola, Inc."

== Participating universities ==
- Arizona State University
- Auburn University
- Boston University
- Carnegie Mellon University
- Clemson University
- Colorado State University
- Columbia University
- Florida Gulf Coast University
- The George Washington University
- Georgia Institute of Technology
- Illinois Institute of Technology
- Iowa State University
- Kansas State University
- Kettering University
- Lehigh University
- Massachusetts Institute of Technology
- Michigan State University
- Michigan Technological University
- New Jersey Institute of Technology
- New Mexico State University
- North Carolina State University
- Northeastern University
- Oklahoma State University
- Old Dominion University
- Purdue University
- Rensselaer Polytechnic University
- Southern Methodist University
- The University of Alabama in Huntsville
- The University of Alabama
- University of Alaska Fairbanks
- The University of Arizona
- University of Arkansas
- University of California, Berkeley
- University of California, Davis
- University of Colorado at Boulder
- University of Delaware
- University of Florida
- University of Idaho
- University of Illinois Urbana–Champaign
- University of Kentucky
- University of Maryland, College Park
- University of Massachusetts Amherst
- University of Minnesota
- University of Missouri-Rolla
- University of Nebraska–Lincoln
- The University of New Mexico
- University of Notre Dame
- University of South Carolina
- University of Southern California
- The University of Tennessee
- University of Washington
- University of Wisconsin–Madison
- Vanderbilt University
