= Alexander Kusenko =

American theoretical physicist

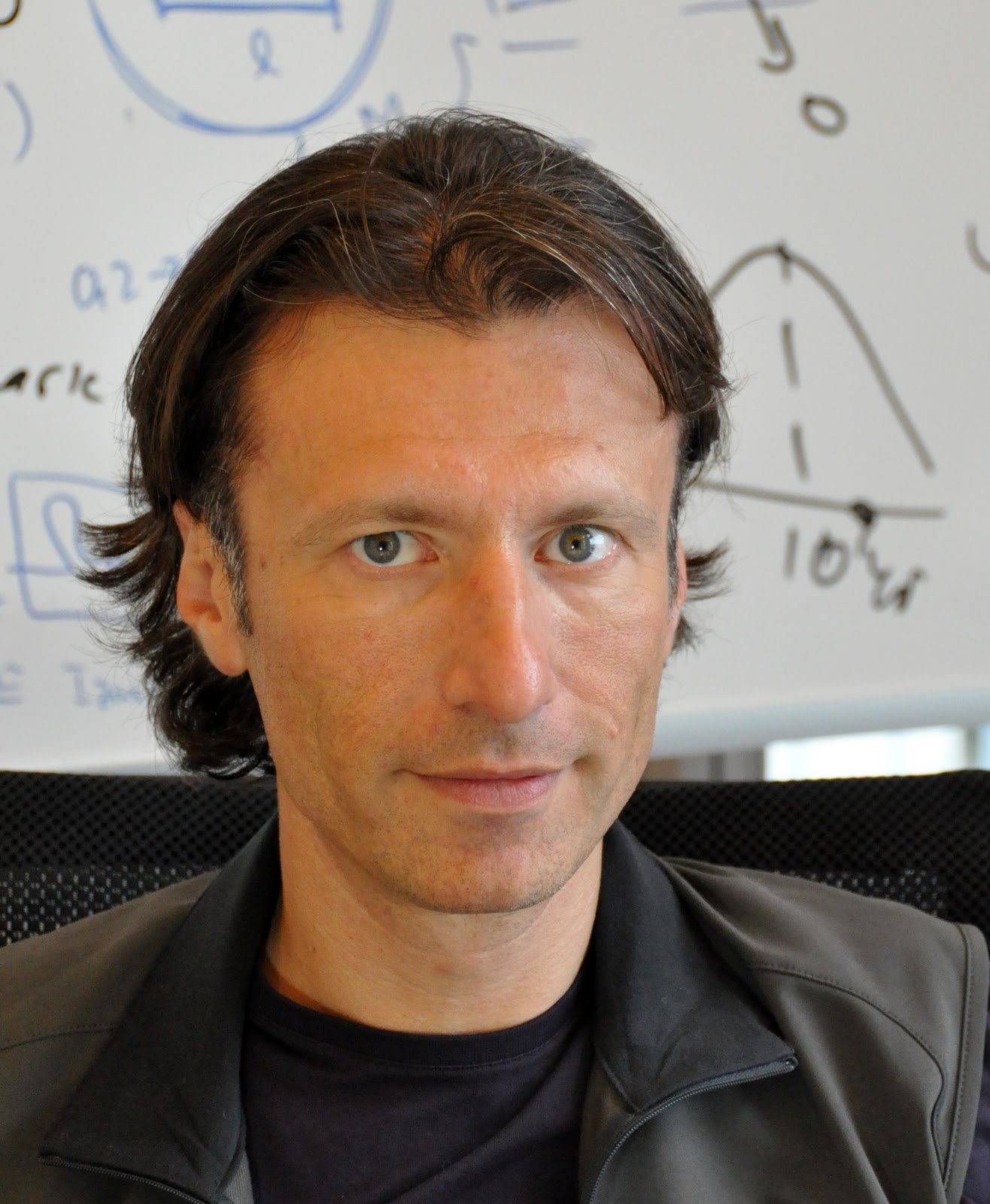
- Alex Kusenko in 2011
- Born: March 1966 (age 60); Simferopol, Soviet Ukraine, Soviet Union
- Citizenship: American
- Education: Moscow State University (BSc); Stony Brook University (PhD)
- Scientific career
- Fields: Theoretical physics Astrophysics; Cosmology
- Workplaces: UCLA; Kavli Institute for the Physics and Mathematics of the Universe; CERN; University of Pennsylvania
- Doctoral advisor: Robert Shrock
- Website: http://kusenko.physics.ucla.edu/

Alexander Kusenko is a theoretical physicist who is currently a Professor of Physics and Astronomy at the University of California, Los Angeles (UCLA). In addition, Kusenko holds an appointment of Senior Scientist at the Kavli Institute for the Physics and Mathematics of the Universe (IPMU) since February 2008. He has served as a general member of the board of Aspen Center for Physics 2004-2019. Kusenko was awarded the status of Fellow of the American Physical Society in 2008 for original and seminal contributions to particle physics, astrophysics, and cosmology. In 2021, Kusenko was awarded a Simons Fellowship in Theoretical Physics. In 2021, he entered a $10,000 wager with Derek Muller over the possibility of sailing a land vehicle straight downwind faster than the wind, which he later conceded.
