= Goldhaber experiment =

1957 measurement of the neutrino helicity

Lee Grodzins with the apparatus used in the Goldhaber experiment.

The Goldhaber experiment, also known as the Goldhaber–Grodzins–Sunyar experiment, was a particle physics experiment conducted in 1957 at Brookhaven National Laboratory by Maurice Goldhaber, Lee Grodzins, and Andrew Sunyar. It was the first experiment to measure the helicity of the neutrino. The helicity or "handedness" of a particle is the projection of its spin along its direction of motion, with the terms "right-handed" and "left-handed" referring to positive and negative helicity, respectively. Less than a year prior to the Goldhaber experiment, the discovery of parity violation had established that contrary to what had previously been assumed, the laws of physics do not treat left-handed and right-handed particles the same way in all interactions. This opened up the possibility that neutrinos could exist with only one helicity, an idea of significant interest due to its implications for the development of a theory of weak interactions.

As neutrinos are extremely difficult to detect, their effects had to be observed indirectly. Goldhaber and his colleagues achieved this by employing a radioactive decay sequence in which the neutrino helicity can be passed on to photons produced in the same decay. The helicity of the photons was analyzed by measuring their transmission through a magnet. For the experiment to work, the decay sequence was required to have a very specific set of properties. Only one such decay — that of ^{152m}Eu — was known to satisfy the requirements. The experiment was assembled on a tabletop and took less than two months to complete.

The results were consistent with neutrinos being entirely left-handed. This provided evidence in favor of the vector minus axial vector (V−A) structure of weak interactions and helped to establish the universal V−A theory. The experiment has drawn praise for its ingenuity, with the physicist Valentine Telegdi describing it as "an experiment of unsurpassed elegance".

== Background ==
By the mid-1950s, beta decay, muon decay, and muon capture reactions were understood to originate from the same underlying interaction, known as the weak interaction. Following the Fermi theory, it was assumed that the interaction was universal, meaning that a single coupling constant determined the strength in all its manifestations. A remaining question concerned the type of coupling between particles in weak interactions, with the dominant sentiment at the time favoring tensor and scalar (T, S) couplings. The proposal by Tsung-Dao Lee and Chen-Ning Yang that parity may not be a symmetry of the weak interaction, and the subsequent discovery of parity violation the following year by Chien-Shiung Wu and colleagues, expanded the range of possibilities and prompted a fresh analysis of experimental results that had previously been interpreted under the assumption of parity conservation.

Several ideas began emerging that promised to salvage the universality of the weak interaction while accommodating parity violation. The two-component neutrino theory, proposed independently by Lee and Yang, Lev Landau, and Abdus Salam, provided a natural explanation of parity violation. It postulated that the neutrino (which was assumed to be massless at the time) existed with only a single helicity, an idea that prior to the discovery of parity violation was thought to be prohibited in nature. This idea was incorporated into the V−A theory, first advanced by George Sudarshan and Robert Marshak and then independently by Richard Feynman and Murray Gell-Mann. According to the V−A theory, the weak interaction is chiral and couples only to left-handed particles and right-handed antiparticles. The theory required the neutrino to be left-handed and the antineutrino to be right-handed.

The V−A theory was proposed at a time when the experimental landscape appeared to contradict it, including the widely accepted results of Brice M. Rustad and Stanley Ruby. The Rustad–Ruby experiments had found evidence that the Gamow–Teller transition in the beta decay of ^{6}He was of the T form. When combined with existing data, this pointed to a non-universal T, S type interaction and a right-handed neutrino. The neutrino helicity therefore became a pressing question in the pursuit of a theory of weak interactions.

== Experimental principle ==
The experiment used an isotope which undergoes electron capture decay followed by the emission of a gamma ray. For those decays in which the neutrino and gamma ray are emitted in opposite directions, the gamma ray receives just enough extra energy from the recoiling nucleus to enable resonant scattering on a target consisting of the daughter isotope. Angular momentum conservation ensures that in these back-to-back decays, the neutrino helicity is transferred to the gamma ray. The neutrino helicity could therefore be determined by comparing resonant scattering rates for gamma rays of each helicity, without requiring the neutrino to be detected.

=== Decay scheme ===
Diagram showing the spin and momentum of all bodies at each step of the decay. In each panel the steps proceed from top to bottom. Arrows drawn with single lines represent momentum, while the short and long arrows drawn with double lines represent spins of ½ and 1, respectively. For back-to-back decays, the helicity of the gamma ray is the same as that of the neutrino, regardless of whether the neutrino has positive helicity (top panel) or negative helicity (bottom panel).

Goldhaber and his colleagues used ^{152m}Eu, an isomer of europium with a 9.3 hour half life. It decays by K-shell capture through a Gamow–Teller transition to an excited state of samarium, emitting an electron neutrino:

$$^{152m}\mathrm{Eu} + e^{-}\rightarrow ~^{152}\mathrm{Sm}^{*} + \nu_e$$

The neutrino is produced with an energy of 910 keV. (Note: The neutrino energy is given by the difference between the 956.8 keV decay energy and the 46.8 keV binding energy of the captured electron in the daughter atom. The binding energy is released after the decay through the emission of X-rays and Auger electrons.) The excited samarium nucleus promptly de-excites to the ground state by emitting a gamma ray:

$$^{152}\mathrm{Sm}^{*} \rightarrow ~^{152}\mathrm{Sm} + \gamma$$

The gamma ray carries the transition energy of 963.4 keV minus the 3 eV of kinetic energy taken by the recoiling samarium nucleus. This recoil energy loss is enough to make the gamma ray non-resonant with the transition, preventing it from exciting another nucleus to the same excited state, unless additional energy compensates for the deficit. Since momentum conservation requires the absorbing nucleus to recoil with 3 eV as well, the total deficit is 6 eV.

Because the lifetime of the samarium excited state is sufficiently short, the gamma ray is typically emitted while the samarium nucleus is still recoiling from the neutrino emission. This causes a Doppler shift, with the sign and magnitude of the shift determined by the emission direction relative to the initial velocity of the nucleus. When the gamma ray is emitted along the direction of motion of the recoiling nucleus, it receives the maximum shift of 6 eV, and the full deficit is eliminated (at least to within the Doppler-broadened linewidth of 0.5 eV). This cancellation of the deficit is possible because the neutrino and gamma ray energies happen to be approximately equal. As a result, resonant absorption of the gamma ray can occur, but only if the neutrino and gamma ray are emitted in near-opposite directions. Resonance fluorescence is therefore tied to the direction of the outgoing neutrino.

Both the initial ^{152m}Eu nucleus and the final ^{152}Sm nucleus have a total angular momentum of J = 0, while the intermediate ^{152}Sm^{*} nucleus has J = 1 (using natural units with $\hbar=1$). For captures from the K shell, the electron has no orbital angular momentum and only its spin contributes. The total initial angular momentum of the electron-nucleus system is therefore J = 1/2. To conserve angular momentum in the decay, the neutrino must be emitted with its spin opposite that of the ^{152}Sm^{*} nucleus. The nucleus then transfers its unit of angular momentum to the gamma ray when it relaxes to its J = 0 ground state. This means that if the gamma ray is emitted opposite the neutrino, its spin will likewise be anti-aligned with that of the neutrino. This fact, when paired with the resonance criterion, implies that the helicity of those gamma rays which are resonantly scattered is the same as that of the neutrinos. A measurement of the resonance fluorescence rate as a function of the gamma ray helicity (i.e. the circular polarization state) therefore constitutes a measurement of the neutrino helicity.

=== Experimental requirements ===
Valentine Telegdi noted retrospectively that the experiment was only possible because the ^{152m}Eu decay satisfies all of the following conditions:

1. The spin sequence is 0 − 1 − 0 so the gamma ray and neutrino spins are uniquely determined;
2. The lifetime of the intermediate state is short enough for the de-excitation to occur before the recoiling nucleus has changed direction; (Note: More specifically, Telegdi noted that the short lifetime effectively necessitates the spin-parity sequence 0^{−} − 1^{−} − 0^{+}. As a fast decay to a 0^{+} ground state requires an E1 transition, the intermediate state must be 1^{−}; for the electron capture to that 1^{−} state to be allowed, the initial state must be 0^{−}.)
3. The energies carried by the neutrino and the gamma ray are approximately equal, such that the neutrino-induced Doppler shift cancels the energy lost to the recoiling nuclei;
4. The energies are large enough to avoid the Mössbauer effect and to make analysis of the gamma ray polarization possible;
5. The daughter isotope is sufficiently abundant for its use as a scattering target to be practical.

Goldhaber believed there to be only a single isotope which met all of these requirements. At the time of the measurement, only his group knew of the ^{152m}Eu decay sequence; it was published for the first time in the letter preceding the one announcing the neutrino helicity measurement in the same Physical Review issue.

== Experiment description ==
Goldhaber came up with the idea for the experiment in October 1957 while surveying existing papers on neutrino helicity in preparation for a talk at the December meeting of the American Physical Society at Stanford. As Grodzins had at that time already measured the neutrino-momentum-induced resonance fluorescence of ^{152}Sm, Goldhaber's insight was that the unique spin sequence enabled the neutrino helicity to be determined unambiguously. Moreover, the measurement he proposed employed the same technique for analyzing the gamma ray polarization as the team had used to study bremsstrahlung from beta particles earlier that same year.

Schematic showing the apparatus. Gamma rays emitted downward from the ^{152m}Eu source pass through the magnet and induce resonance fluorescence in the Sm_{2}O_{3} scatterer, which is then detected by the scintillator detector.

The setup consisted of a ^{152m}Eu source and a ^{152}Sm scattering target with magnetized iron between them to provide helicity-dependent attenuation of the transiting gamma rays. A scintillator detector was used to count photons produced in the target via resonant scattering, providing a measure of how many gamma rays had transited the iron. This was done with the magnetization direction both parallel and antiparallel to the path of the gamma rays. The helicity of the gamma rays could then be determined from the asymmetry in the measured rates.

=== Apparatus ===
The ^{152m}Eu source was produced by bombarding Eu_{2}O_{3} with thermal neutrons at the Brookhaven nuclear reactor. The source was placed in a bore through the center of a cylindrical iron-core electromagnet which could be magnetized to saturation in either direction along its axis. Gamma rays emitted downward from the source therefore had to travel approximately three mean free paths through the iron, with many undergoing Compton scattering off electrons in the iron before exiting. The Compton scattering cross section is maximal when the spin of the incoming photon is opposite that of the electron. For gamma rays predominantly of one helicity, this results in more attenuation with one magnetization direction than the other.

The target consisted of Sm_{2}O_{3} in a ring-shaped container positioned beneath the magnet. At the center of the ring, a NaI(Tl) scintillator and a photomultiplier tube (PMT) were used to detect gamma rays produced through nuclear resonance fluorescence in the scatterer. Iron and mu-metal cylinders encased the scintillator and PMT to shield them from the magnetic field. A conical lead shield sat on the scintillator and PMT assembly, with the magnet containing the source mounted at its top. The lead cone was used to shield the scintillator detector from gamma rays originating from the source rather than from the scatterer. The entire apparatus was built on a tabletop.

=== Measurements ===
Data was collected in nine datasets ranging in length from 3 to 9 hours using sources with activities of approximately 50 millicuries. The magnetic field direction was alternated every three minutes. The first two datasets used liquid sources consisting of the activated Eu_{2}O_{3} dissolved in hydrochloric acid, while the remaining seven used solid sources. For the final three datasets, a shorter 3.5 inch magnet was used with the source placed on top, slightly decreasing the length of iron traversed by the gamma rays.

Events were counted in three channels referred to as A, B, and C, each spanning a different energy interval. The resonant scattering peaks at 963 keV (from transitions to the ground state) and 840 keV (from transitions to a lower-energy excited state) were both within the range of channel B, the main signal channel. Channel A counted events at lower energy dominated by Compton-scattered gamma rays while channel C counted higher-energy background events. These background channels were monitored to identify artifacts of the field reversal that did not arise from a true resonant scattering asymmetry.

The rate asymmetry in a given channel is defined as

$$\delta = \frac{N_- - N_+}{\frac{1}{2}\left(N_- + N_+\right)}$$

where $N_+$ and $N_-$ are the background-subtracted counting rates with magnetic field pointing up and down, respectively. The gamma ray helicity was determined from the sign of $\delta$ for channel B, with positive $\delta$ corresponding to negative helicity, and vice versa. (Note: Because the electron has a negative spin magnetic moment, the spin polarization direction is opposite the direction of the magnetic field. A downward-pointing magnetic field therefore results in more attenuation of positive helicity gamma rays due to their higher probability of Compton scattering off spin-up electrons. The result is $N_->N_+$ and therefore $\delta>0$.) No asymmetry was observed in channel C, while a small asymmetry was observed in channel A which could be attributed to Compton scattering.

In addition to the setup and data collection, which took about ten days, the experimenters spent a month conducting tests to understand experimental systematics prior to publication. To test the magnetic shielding, a ^{137}Cs source was placed next to the scintillation detector and data was collected in two narrow energy intervals on the steep edges of the 662 keV photopeak. No energy shift was observed between the two magnetization directions. A dataset was also collected using a dummy scatterer made of lead in place of the Sm_{2}O_{3} to verify that no baseline asymmetry was present to within the accuracy of the experiment. The effective path length through the fully magnetized portion of the iron was somewhat uncertain, so the final three datasets with the shorter magnet were collected as a consistency check on the previous results. Finally, the response of the magnet was tested using bremsstrahlung from a ^{90}Sr + ^{90}Y source which the authors had previously found to have negative helicity.

=== Results ===
The experiment found that the neutrino has negative helicity. The resonant scattering asymmetry was measured to be δ = +0.017 ± 0.003, indicating that the helicity of the gamma rays, and therefore the neutrinos, was negative. The authors had calculated an expected asymmetry of δ = ± 0.025 if 100% of the gamma rays were circularly polarized. Their measured result indicated that the gamma rays were 67 ± 10% circularly polarized when all nine datasets were combined, though this did not imply the same negative helicity fraction for the neutrinos.

Several effects were expected to result in less than 100% circular polarization. When corrections for the decay kinematics and the lifetime of the samarium excited state were applied, the expectation was 84%. This calculation neglected the contributions of electron captures from the L and M shells and the effects of thermal motion which were further expected to lower the circular polarization fraction. The measurement was therefore described as being compatible with 100% of the neutrinos having negative helicity.

== Impact and legacy ==
Goldhaber, Grodzins, and Sunyar conveyed the result in a paper submitted to Physical Review on December 11, 1957, and Goldhaber presented it at Stanford nine days later. Initially, the authors simply reported consistency with 100% of neutrinos being left handed but did not quantify this result. Grodzins later reported the result in a 1959 review as $\mathcal{H}_\nu=-1.0\pm0.15$. Before the end of 1958, other results began to fall into alignment with those of the Goldhaber experiment. Wu and Arthur Schwarzschild identified systematic errors in the Rustad–Ruby experiments that could account for their earlier results favoring the T structure in Gamow–Teller transitions, criticisms later echoed by Rustad and Ruby themselves. Ingvar Marklund and Lorne A. Page replicated the neutrino helicity result using a similar experimental design and the same isotope, finding $\mathcal{H}_\nu=-0.8\pm0.3$. Page had previously proposed the experimental concept independently but did not specify a suitable isotope.

The finding established that the Gamow–Teller transition is axial vector and was interpreted as a confirmation of the two-component neutrino theory. Of the two possible helicity combinations in the two-component theory, it found that the one with left-handed neutrinos and right-handed antineutrinos is realized. This helped to cement V−A theory as the basis for all weak interactions. As a consequence, the weak interaction was taken to be universal, and lepton number conservation — a key ingredient in the V−A description — was assumed to hold.

As established by the discovery of neutrino oscillations, neutrinos have small but nonzero masses, invalidating the two-component theory's assumption of masslessness. The theory's single-helicity assumption remains a valid approximation, as neutrinos created in weak interactions are overwhelmingly left-handed. (Note: The probability of the opposite-helicity component in the superposition is suppressed by $\left(m_\nu/E_\nu\right)^2$, where $m_\nu$ is the neutrino mass and $E_\nu$ is its energy.) The chiral structure of the weak interaction originally introduced in V−A theory, for which the Goldhaber experiment provided early support, has survived and been incorporated into the Standard Model.

The experiment has been praised for its elegance and ingenuity, in particular for its use of the neutrino momentum to induce resonance fluorescence. Nobel laureate Georges Charpak called it the most beautiful experiment he knew, while historian of science Robert P. Crease described it as "so fiendishly ingenious that most physicists at the time did not even think it was possible in principle." Writing in 2012, Crease also noted that ^{152}Eu remained the only known isotope with the particular decay path that made the experiment possible.

== See also ==
- Cowan–Reines neutrino experiment
- Parity (physics)
- Electroweak interaction
