= Noor Muhammad Butt =

Pakistani physicist (born 1936)

- Born: 3 June 1936 (age 90); Sialkot, Punjab, India (Present-day in Punjab, Pakistan)
- Citizenship: Pakistan
- Education: Murray College; Government College University; University of Birmingham
- Known for: Neutron science and Nanotechnology; Mössbauer spectroscopy Mössbauer effect Nuclear deterrence
- Awards: Sitara-i-Imtiaz (Star of Distinction) (1992) by the President of Pakistan; ICTP Award (1975)
- Scientific career
- Fields: Nuclear Physics
- Workplaces: Pakistan Atomic Energy Commission; Quaid-i-Azam University; International Centre for Theoretical Physics (ICTP); CERN and IAEA; Preston University
- Theses: Crystal diffraction studies with Mossbauer gamma rays (1965); Structure Properties of Cubic Crystals (1993)
- Doctoral advisor: Philip Burton Moon
- Other academic advisors: Rudolf Peierls; Rafi Muhammad Chaudhry

Noor Muhammad Butt (Urdu: نور محمد بٹ); b. 3 June 1936), SI, FPAS, also known as N. M. Butt, is a Pakistani nuclear physicist and professor of physics at the Preston University who is known for his research publications in understanding the gamma-rays burst, Mössbauer effect, diffraction, later the nanotechnology.

Besides teaching courses in topics involving the modern physics, his career has spent working in branches of physics at the national laboratory in Nilore and has authored several college textbooks in physics based on his research, and presently serving as the chairman of the Institute of Nano Science and Technology at the Preston University.

== Biography ==
Butt was born in Sialkot, Punjab, British India on 3 June 1936. He is of Kashmiri descent. He completed his matriculation from the Muslim High School, Sialkot. In 1951, Butt enrolled to attend the Murray College to study physics and graduated with BSc in physics in 1955, standing top in his class of 1955 of the Murray College.

He went to attend the Government College University in Lahore to study physics under Dr. Rafi Muhammad where his research was focused towards the quantum reaction in nuclear physics, covering the topic of bombardment of Li^{6} high-energy protons to emit the energy spectrum of alpha particle. In 1957, he graduated with MSc in nuclear physics after successfully defending his thesis written under dr. Rafi Muhammad. His graduation was noted in the local university press when he was conferred with the Roll of Honor by the university.

In 1963, he went to attend the Birmingham University in England on Commonwealth Scholarship for his doctoral studies, and carried out his doctoral studies under Dr. Philip Burton Moon. He studied topics in solid state physics and kinetic theory of solids under Rudolf Peierls while conducting his doctoral studies on the diffraction with Mössbauer effect through the spectroscopy techniques under Dr. William Burchman. In 1965, Butt successfully defended his doctoral thesis and was conferred with the PhD in nuclear physics under the supervision of Philip Burton Moon from the Birmingham University in England.

He remained associated with the Birmingham University in England and taught various courses on physics as a visiting professor while he collaborated with British physicist, Dr. D.A. O'Conner, at the Department of Nuclear Physics in Birmingham University. In 1993, Butt was conferred with the DSc in physics, titled: "Structure Properties of Cubic Crystals", that covered wide range of topics in material science and solid-state physics— though this research work was based on independent but authoritative and classified research sponsored by the British government.

== Career at Government of Pakistan ==
=== Pakistan Atomic Energy Commission ===
The emission of electron and proton from neutron known as β-minus decay in nuclear physics.

In 1961, Butt secured employment in the Pakistan Atomic Energy Commission (PAEC) as a scientific officer, and worked on the problems involved in reactor physics before departing to England for his doctoral studies. Upon returning in 1966, Butt joined the Fast Neutron Physics Group at the Institute of Nuclear Science and Technology in Nilore, where he conducted work on the neutron diffraction to understand crystalline arrangement in the atomic structure.

His career is mostly spent at the Institute of Nuclear Science and Technology, the country national laboratory site in Nilore, where he was instrumental in conducting scientific investigations in solid-state materials using the lattice dynamical settings and powder diffraction techniques. Much of his scientific work at the national laboratory site remains classified in regards to its relation to the development of his nation's nuclear weapons. From 1966 to 1978, Butt engaged in further scientific understanding of the neutron, an important subatomic particle, and studied the utilization of the Pakistan Atomic Research Reactor with Neutron Activation Analysis. In 1978, Butt passed over his work in understanding neutron applications when he was appointed director of Nuclear Physics Division where he became interested in the nuclear binding energy in the nucleus, the isotopic island of stability, phonon and the Mössbauer effect.

While leading the Nuclear Physics Division, Butt oversaw the establishment of the "New Labs" where many of his contributions were vital in scientific understanding in synthetic elements such as plutonium ^{93}Pu. In 1984, Butt was appointed as associate director of the Institute of Nuclear Science and Technology, and promoted to its director in 1991. In 1995, he eventually took over the Institute of Nuclear Science and Technology as its director-general, but left the directorship for a chief scientist position in 1996.

In 1998, Butt was part of a small team that eye-witnessed the nuclear chain reaction during the atomic tests in the mountains of Balochistan in Pakistan. In 1999, he was of the opinion to favor the development of the less destructive neutron bomb as opposed to the much larger blast radius guaranteed by the hydrogen-based design of nuclear weapons.

In 1999, Butt eventually left the Institute of Nuclear Science and Technology when he retired as first "Scientist Emeritus", and subsequently returned to academia to teach courses on physics.

=== Academia and publications ===
In 1957, Butt joined the faculty of physics at the Government College University, eventually becoming the lecturer in physics in 1958 and remained at his alma mater till 1961. He then taught physics at the University of Birmingham for several years and worked closely with British physicist, Dr. D. A. O'Conner, on the applications of diffraction, wave mechanics, and neutron scattering. Their work was sponsored and supported by the U.S. Department of Energy through the OSTI. Collaboration between Butt and O'Connor established the scientific confirmation of Ivar Waller's Theory of Phonons at the Bragg diffraction peaks using the Mössbauer spectroscopy from LiF's single crystals. Their work has been extensively cited for several decades and printed in several books including those of Cambridge University Press and North Holland Publishers in the United Kingdom. He remained associated with the CERN in Switzerland and the International Center for Theoretical Physics (ICTP) in Italy where his work on solid-state physics was widely recognized.

In 1973, Butt joined the faculty of natural science at the Quaid-i-Azam University and briefly taught a course on solid-state physics and taught courses on material science while supervised one of his student's PhD thesis at the Quaid-i-Azam University. He also served on the examiner board for doctoral and master's thesis programs at the Punjab University and Bahauddin Zakariya University. He taught courses on physics at the Quaid-i-Azam University until 2000 when he joined the University of Oxford to teach physics.

In 1973, Butt authored a college textbook, "Waves and Oscillation" that covers wide range of topics in wave mechanics, sound vibration, and theory of optics, which is extensively used by students in physics and mechanical engineering students in Pakistan. In 1996, he also authored a policy book, "CTBT & Its Implications".

=== Public advocacy ===
After his retirement from PAEC in 2000, Butt begin public advocacy for the benefits of the nanotechnology and engaged in providing education when he was appointed Chairman of National Commission on Nano-Science and Technology (NCNST) in 2003 and led till 2005. In addition, he also served as the chairman of Pakistan Science Foundation until 2010 where the PSF initiated several awareness programs on nanotechnology in Pakistan.

After 1998, Butt effectively countered the anti-nuclear movement in the country to roll back the country's nuclear capability by noting in the public that the country would also have to roll back its programs at its national laboratories and cutting-edge research in nuclear technology as it was being useful in energy generation, medicines, agriculture, medical usage of lasers, electronics, supercomputing, nanotechnology, and communication technology.

In 2010 interview with the news media, Butt also vehemently dismissed the American concerns about his nation's atomic weapons fall into the hands of terrorists as "farce claim" noting that they would be unable to select sequence targets to launch the missiles since they don't have required scientific education to understand the locking and triggering mechanism to activate nuclear devices.

== Publications and honors ==
=== Bibliography ===
- Butt, N. M. (1973). Waves and Oscillations. Lahore, Punj. Pakistan: University of Punjab Press, and Punjab Textbook Board. p. 1973.
- Butt, N. M.; Khan, S. S. (1998). CTBT and its implications. Islamabad: The Pakistan Nuclear Society.

=== Awards and honours ===
- Khwarizmi International Award (1995)
- Sitara-e-Imtiaz (1992)
- Gold Medal, Pakistan Academy of Sciences (1990)
- ICTP Award in Solid State Physics (1979)
- ICTP Award in Nuclear Physics (1970)

== See also ==
- Solid state physics
