= Rafi Muhammad Chaudhry =

Pakistani physicist (1903–1988)

Rafi Muhammad Chaudhry رفیع محمد چوہدری
- Born: Rao Rafi Muhammad; 1 July 1903; Kahnaur, Rohtak district, British India
- Died: 4 December 1988 (aged 85); Lahore, Punjab, Pakistan
- Education: Aligarh Muslim University; University of Cambridge
- Occupation: Physicist
- Known for: Gamma and beta decay, and his work in atomic and nuclear physics in Pakistan fission energy research
- Awards: Sitara-i-Khidmat (1954); Sitara-i-Imtiaz (1965); Nishan-e-Imtiaz (1998); Hilal-i-Imtiaz (2004)
- Scientific career
- Fields: Nuclear physics
- Workplaces: Pakistan Atomic Energy Commission (PAEC); Pakistan Institute of Nuclear Science and Technology (PINSTECH); Government College University (GCU); High Tension Laboratory (HTL); Aligarh Muslim University; University of Birmingham; University of California; Atomic Energy Research Establishment (AERE)
- Doctoral advisor: Ernest Rutherford
- Doctoral students: Tahir Hussain
- Other notable students: Samar Mubarakmand; Noor Muhammad Butt

Rafi Muhammad Chaudhry (Urdu: رفیع محمد چوہدری) FPAS HI, NI, SI, Skdt (1 July 1903 – 4 December 1988) best known as R. M. Chaudhry, was a Pakistani nuclear physicist and a professor of particle physics at the Government College University. His teaching and instructions on modern physics influenced many of his student to pursue careers in physics who regard him as one of the key architects and the pioneer of experimental nuclear physics research in Pakistan and, along with Abdus Salam and Ishrat Hussain Usmani, one of the main creators of Pakistan's nuclear weapons research program in the 1970s. Chaudhry, who served as professor of nuclear physics at Government College University, was later referred to by Dr. Samar Mubarakmand, one of his students, as "the true father of the nuclear weapons program of Pakistan".

== Early life and education ==
Chaudhry was born on 1 July 1903 to a middle-class Rajput family (Rao) in Kahnaur, a small village in Rohtak district, Haryana. He passed the university entrance exam with highest marks and earned a scholarship awarded by the Viceroy Rufus Isaacs, 1st Marquess of Reading. He used the scholarship to enroll as a student of chemical engineering at Aligarh University in 1923, but after taking an engineering physics course, he decided to change his focus to thermodynamics and multivariable calculus. He was successful as a physics student, earning the respect of his peers and professors.

In 1927, Chaudhry took his BSc in Experimental physics, followed by his 1929 MSc in physics with First Class Honours. The same year, Chaudhry gained attention from Hamidullah Khan, the Nawab of Bhopal of princely state of Bhopal, who awarded him a science scholarship for higher studies. Under that scholarship, Chaudhry travelled to United Kingdom to study for his doctoral degree. Chaudhry joined the Cavendish Laboratory of the University of Cambridge. At Cambridge, Chaudhry studied Calculus of mathematical Integrals, and learned Tensor calculus, quantum physics, and general relativity under Nobel laureate in Chemistry Ernest Rutherford. At Cavendish, he studied with Mark Oliphant, who particularly influenced him to study nuclear physics. Chaudhry and Oliphant carried out research in artificial disintegration of the atomic nucleus and positive ions. In 1932, Chaudhry earned his D.Phil in Nuclear physics from Cambridge University with his thesis "The action of positive ions in the electrical discharge through gases" under Ernest Rutherford. He then returned to India.

== Professorship in Europe ==
At age 30, Chaudhry moved to Lahore and took an academic professorship in physics at the Lahore Islamia College. In 1935, he became the chairman of the department of physics there, remaining in that position until 1938. In 1938, Chaudhry moved back to Aligarh Muslim University (AMU) to teach physics, again becoming head of his department. In 1944, Chaudhry was contacted by Mark Oliphant, who offered him an opportunity to return to the Cavendish Laboratory. In response, Chaudhry moved to United Kingdom, where he joined Oxford University's Nuffield College and was appointed a Nuffield Fellow. Along with Oliphant and Homi J. Bhabha, Chaudhry created a group of physicists that did research in theories of gamma and beta decay, as well as researching the neutrino—postulated by Wolfgang Pauli in 1930—Compton scattering, and the behaviour of slow neutrons during the atomic bombardment process.

== Return to India ==
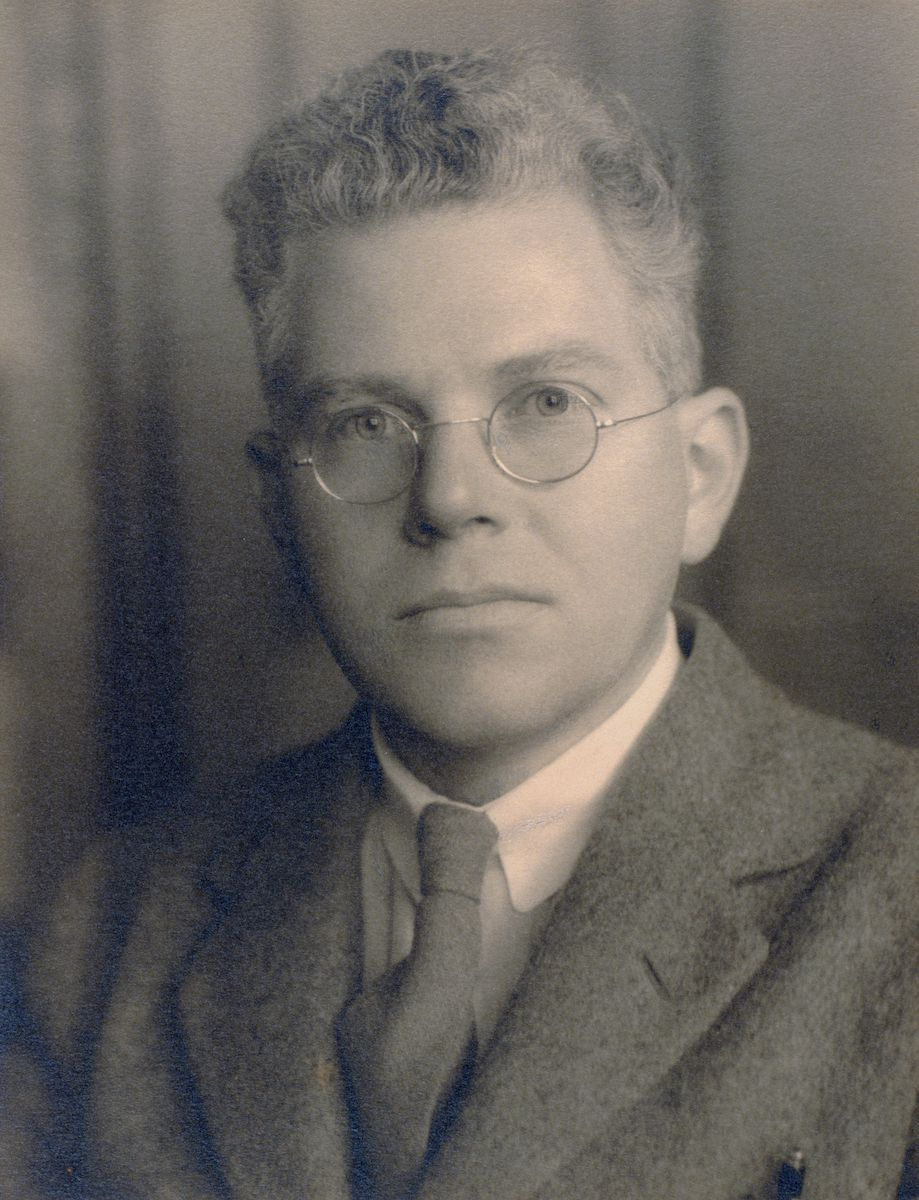
In 1948 Mark Oliphant sent a letter to Muhammad Ali Jinnah recommending he hire Chaudhry.

In 1948, months after the partition of India into dominions of India and Pakistan, Chaudhry was in Great Britain and was contacted by Indian Premier Jawaharlal Nehru. Nehru offered him a senior position at the National Physical Laboratory of India. Oliphant wrote a letter to the governor-general of Pakistan, Muhammad Ali Jinnah. The letter encouraged Jinnah to engage his country in research in nuclear technology, particularly nuclear physics.

== Pakistan ==
Following his settlement in Pakistan, the government of Pakistan asked him to engage research in physics at the Government College University. In 1952, Chaudhry established the High Tension Laboratory (now amalgamated into Center for Advanced Studies in Physics) as an offshoot of the Physics Department at Government College. Chaudhry was an instrumental figure in the installation of the 1.2 MeV Cockcroft-Walton accelerator in the High Tension Laboratory in 1954 for carrying out basic research in atomic and nuclear physics. The research carried out at the laboratory resulted in research publications in Nature and it was visited by the Prince Philip, Duke of Edinburgh in 1958. At High Tension Laboratory, Chaudhry influenced many physicists who studied under him, such as N. M. Butt, Samar Mubarakmand and Abdul Majid who became the senior scientists in Pakistan's indigenous nuclear and space development. After retirement from Government College University in 1958 he continued as the director of High Tension Laboratory until 1965.

== Pakistan Atomic Energy Commission ==
Dr. Rafi Muhammad Chaudhry with English physicist, Thomas Allibone, Naeem Syed (in middle) and his other students in 1964, Government College, Lahore

In 1960, Chaudhry joined the Pakistan Atomic Energy Commission, where he engaged nuclear technology research. He was the first director of the Pakistan Institute of Nuclear Science and Technology (PINSTECH), and was instrumental in the installation of nuclear particle accelerator there. Chaudhry published 42 research papers while at PINSTECH, and due to the sensitivity of the work, the papers were highly classified. Chaudhry was an administrative and influential figure in the establishment of PARR-I reactor as well, as being part team that supervised the first reactor criticality at PINSTECH. In 1967, Rafi supervised the team of scientists at PINSTECH that successfully produced the first batch of radioisotopes.

== Post career ==
In 1973, Rafi moved back to High Tension Laboratory at GCU Lahore. In 1975, he joined the Centre for Solid State Physics at the Punjab University and continued to work there as an honorary Professor; he was made Professor Emeritus in 1977. Chaudhry died peacefully at the age of 85 in Lahore.

== Recognition and honours ==
In 2004, the High Tension Laboratory was renamed as Rafi Chaudhry High Tension Laboratory by the president Pervez Musharaff.

== Family of physicists ==
Chaudhry had nine children, all of whom became physicists. The most distinguished ones are Munawar Chaudhri, employed at the Cavendish Laboratory since 1970, and Anwar Chaudhri.

== Awards ==
- Hilal-i-Imtiaz (2004)
- Nishan-e-Imtiaz (1998)
- Sitara-i-Imtiaz (1965)
- Sitara-i-Khidmat (1954)
