= Tahir Hussain (physicist) =

Pakistani physicist

- Born: 1923; Aligarh, Uttar Pradesh, India (Present-day, Aligarh, Uttar Pradesh in India)
- Died: 21 December 2010 (aged 87); Lahore, Punjab, Pakistan
- Education: Aligarh Muslim University (AMU); Government College University (GCU); Oxford University (OU)
- Known for: Particle physics in standard model, and fission product yield.
- Awards: Tamgha-e-Imtiaz (1965)
- Scientific career
- Fields: Nuclear physics
- Workplaces: Government College University; University of Azad Kashmir; University of Chicago
- Notable students: Ishfaq Ahmad; Samar Mubarakmand

Tahir Hussain (1923– 21 December 2010) was a Pakistani nuclear physicist and an emeritus professor of physics at the Government College University whose research focused on understanding the particle accelerator.

== Biography ==
Hussain was born in 1923 in Aligarh, Uttar Pradesh in the British Indian Empire. He did his graduation in physics from the Aligarh Muslim University (AMU), and earned MSc in physics with honours. At the invitation of the Governor-General of Pakistan Muhammad Ali Jinnah in 1948, he emigrated to Pakistan along with Dr. R.M. Chaudhry, accepting a teaching position as laboratory lecturer at the Government College University in Lahore at the behest of R.M. Chaudhry.

On a scholarship, Hussain went to the United Kingdom to attend Oxford University where he was conferred with a DPhil in Nuclear physics in 1954. Upon returning, he taught courses on solid-state physics in 1955, and took over the chairmanship of the department of physics at the Government College University in 1962. In 1955, he founded the Center For Advance Studies in Physics (CASP), and served as its founding director.

In the 1950s–60s, he visited the United States as a post-doctoral fellow at the State University of New York, University of Chicago, and Massachusetts Institute of Technology (MIT), as well as visiting Harvard University and Stanford University in California. He also visited Lawrence Livermore National Laboratory, and upon returning, he established the Nuclear Research Laboratory in Lahore based on Lawrence Livermore while updating the teaching program in physics at his university.

In 1965–69, he was appointed as Vice-Chancellor of the University of Azad Kashmir, and later found employment with the Pakistani Ministry of Education as a consultant on education. He chaired the EducationUSA network in Pakistan through the Ministry of Education.

In 1972, Hussain was delegated to provide consultation on the studies of mass–energy equivalence and radioactive decay by the Nuclear Physics Group studying under Dr. Ishfaq Ahmad, who was secretly working on the nuclear weapons program.

Throughout his career, Hussain remained on the teaching faculty at the Government College University, and wrote a college physics book, Fundamentals of Physics in 1970, which has been published in new editions since. Tahir Hussain died on 21 December 2010 aged 87. A condolence reference for Hussain, was organized in Government College University in Lahore.

=== Textbooks ===
- Husain, Dr Tahir (1970). Fundamentals of Physics (1st ed.). Lahore, Punj. Pakistan: Qaumi Kutub Khana. p. 305.

== Quotes ==
- "From the theory that I taught, my students produced results".

== Awards ==
- Tamgha-e-Imtiaz (1965)
