= Goldhaber fellows =

Goldhaber fellows are the recipients of the Gertrude and Maurice Goldhaber Dinstinguished Fellowship. The fellowship programs are governed by Brookhaven National Laboratory (BNL). In 2001, BNL has created the Fellowships Program in honor of Gertrude Goldhaber and Maurice Goldhaber, long-time scientists at the lab. The funds of fellowship comes from Battelle Memorial Institute and Stony Brook University, partners in Brookhaven Science Associates. Each year, three to four Goldhaber Fellows are chosen from many nominations in all areas of science performed in the lab. These prestigious Fellowships are awarded to candidates with exceptional talent and credentials who have a strong desire for independent research at the frontiers of their fields. The fellowships are three-year appointments. Candidates should be less than three years past receipt of the Ph.D. at the time of the application. The intention of the program is to select individuals who will qualify for scientific staff positions at BNL upon completion of the appointment. Some Fellows stay on as new BNL scientific staff. Some move on to contribute to faculty positions at other institutions around the world.
