= Decay scheme =

Graphical presentation of transitions occurring in decay of a radioactive substance

The decay scheme of a radioactive substance is a graphical presentation of all the transitions occurring in a decay, and of their relationships. Data on decay schemes are extensively measured and tabulated, in various reference tables.

The decay scheme is usually plotted in a coordinate system, where the vertical axis is energy, increasing from bottom to top, and the horizontal axis is the proton number, increasing from left to right. The arrows indicate the emitted particles. For the gamma rays (vertical arrows), the gamma energies are given; for the beta decay (oblique arrow), the maximum beta energy. Since energy is conserved and since the particles emitted carry away energy, arrows can only go downward (vertically or at an angle) in a decay scheme.

== Examples ==
Decay scheme of ^{60}Co

=== Cobalt-60 ===
Consider the cobalt isotope cobalt-60. ^{60}Co decays (with a half-life of 5.272 years) by emitting an electron (beta decay) into an excited state of ^{60}Ni, which then decays very quickly to the ground state of ^{60}Ni, via two gamma decays.

Nickel is to the right of cobalt, since its proton number (28) is higher by one than that of cobalt (27). In beta decay, the proton number increases by one. For a positron decay and also for an alpha decay (see below), the oblique arrow would go from right to left since in these cases, the proton number decreases.

=== Gold-198 ===
Decay scheme of ^{198}Au

A somewhat more complicated scheme is shown here.

^{198}Au can be produced by irradiating natural gold in a nuclear reactor. ^{198}Au decays via beta decay to one of two excited states or to the ground state of the mercury isotope ^{198}Hg. In the figure, mercury is to the right of gold, since the atomic number of gold is 79, that of mercury is 80. The excited states decay after very short times (2.5 and 23 ps) to the ground state.

=== Metastable ===
Decay scheme of ^{99m}Tc

While excited nuclear states are usually very short lived, decaying almost immediately after a beta decay, some decay slowly and are called "metastable".

For example, the excited state of the technetium isotope ^{99m}Tc (the "m" means it is metastable) decays to the ground state via gamma decay with a half-life of 6 hours.

=== Alpha decay ===
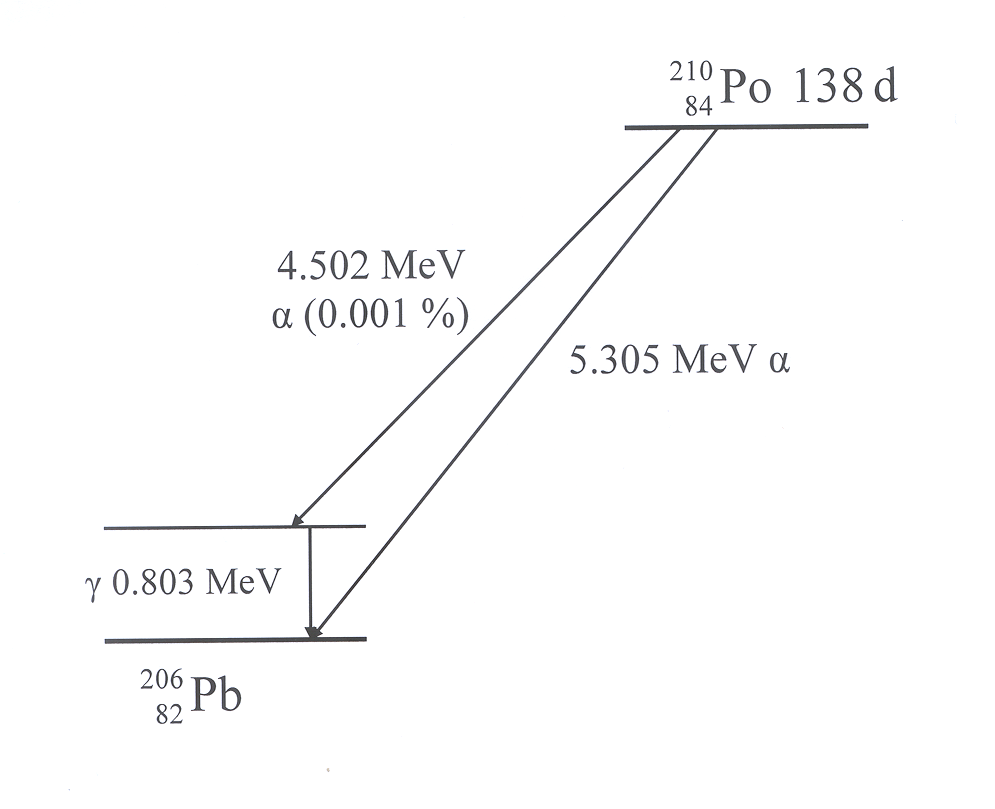
Decay Scheme of ^{210}Po

Polonium-210 discovered by Marie Curie, is the penultimate member of the uranium–radium decay series. It decays into a stable lead-isotope with a half-life of 138 days. In almost all cases, the decay is via the emission of an alpha particle of 5.305 MeV. Only in 0.001% of cases, the decay emits an alpha particle of 4.502 MeV, leading to an excited level of ^{206}Pb, which then decays to the ground state via gamma radiation.

== Selection rules ==
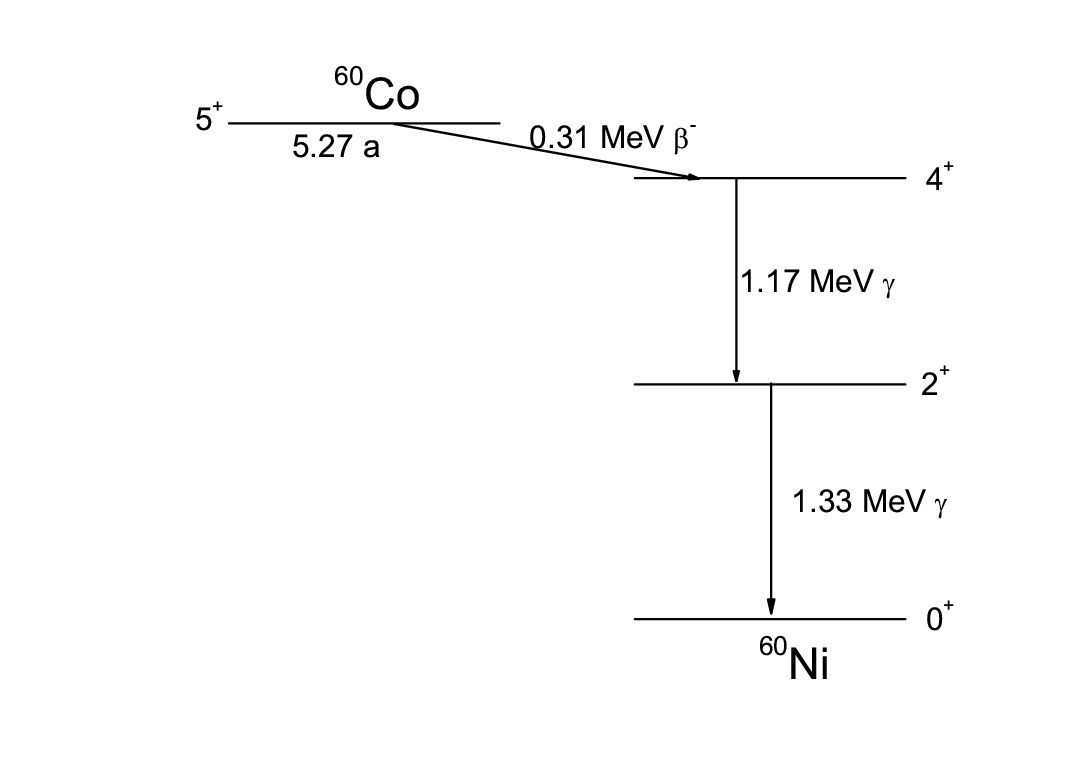
^{60}Co Decay, with spins and parities shown

Alpha- beta- and gamma rays can only be emitted if the conservation laws (energy, angular momentum, parity) are obeyed. This leads to so-called selection rules.

Applications for gamma decay can be found in Multipolarity of gamma radiation. To discuss such a rule in a particular case, it is necessary to know angular momentum and parity for every state. The figure shows the ^{60}Co decay scheme again, with spins and parities given for every state.
