= Lee Grodzins =

American physicist (1926–2025)

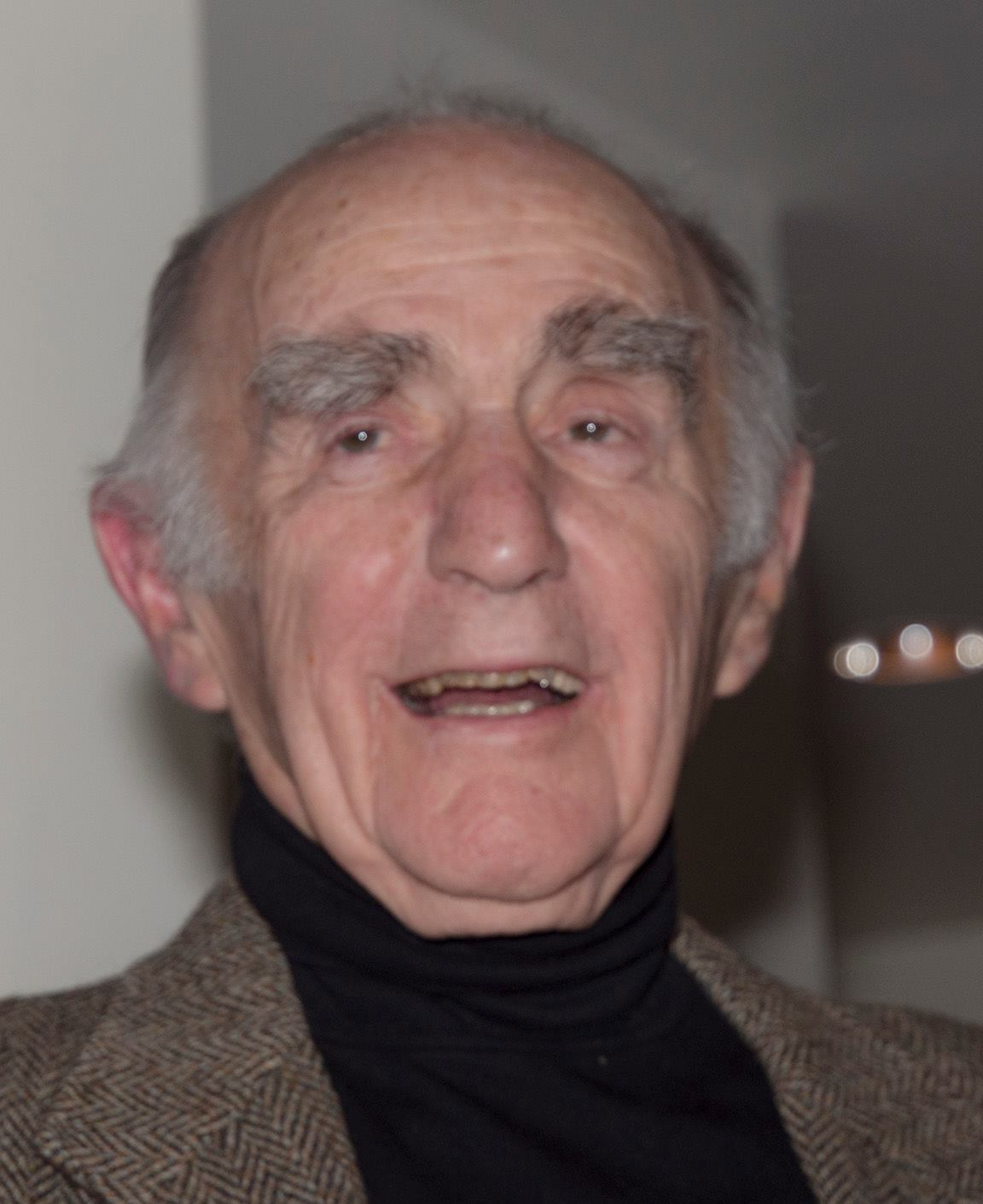
Lee Grodzins in 2015

Lee Grodzins (July 10, 1926 – March 6, 2025) was an American physicist and inventor who was a longtime professor of physics at the Massachusetts Institute of Technology (MIT). After work as a researcher at Brookhaven National Laboratory, Grodzins joined the faculty of MIT, where he taught physics for nearly four decades. He is known for his participation in the 1957 experiment that measured the helicity of the neutrino. He was also head of research and development for Niton Corporation, which developed devices to detect dangerous contaminants and contraband. He wrote more than 170 technical papers and held more than 60 US patents.

== Early life and education ==
Grodzins was born in Lowell, Massachusetts, the son of David Melvin Grodzins and his wife Taube Grodzins, Jewish emigrants, with roots in Poland and Grodno, Belarus. The family settled in Manchester, New Hampshire, where his father ran a gas station and a used tire business. He graduated with a BS degree in engineering in 1946 from the University of New Hampshire. He began his career with General Electric as an assistant in the nuclear physics group at their research laboratory in Schenectady, New York, and earned his master's degree from Union College.

Grodzins earned his PhD in physics at Purdue University in 1954; his thesis was titled "A Cloud Chamber Study of the Single Scattering of 2.5 MeV Positrons by Gold Nuclei". He taught for a year afterwards at Purdue.

== Career and research ==
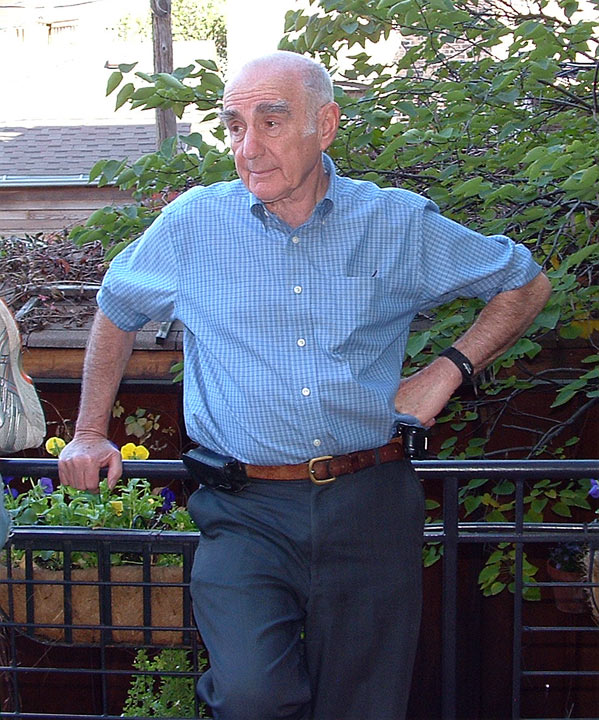
Grodzins in 2007

From 1955 to 1958, Grodzins was a researcher with the nuclear physics group at Brookhaven National Laboratory, probing the properties of the nuclei of atoms. In 1956 he married a biologist whom he met at Brookhaven, Lulu née Anderson (1929–2019). The same year, together with Maurice Goldhaber and Andrew Sunyar, Grodzins performed the Goldhaber experiment, which determined that neutrinos have negative helicity. This work was important in our understanding of the weak interaction. Grodzins joined the faculty of the physics department of MIT in 1959 and was a professor of physics there from 1966 to 1998. In 1985, he carried out the first computer axial tomographic experiment using synchrotron radiation, among other important research projects during his years at MIT.

In 1987, he co-founded and led research and development at Niton Corporation, which developed, manufactured and marketed test kits and instruments to measure radon gas in buildings and toxic elements, such as lead. There he also developed handheld devices that use X-ray fluorescence to determine the composition of metal alloys and to detect other materials. In 1998, he left MIT to work full-time directing the R&D group at Niton, and in 2005, he and his family sold Niton. His sister Ethel Grodzins Romm was the president and CEO of Niton, followed by his son Hal. Grodzins also developed devices to detect explosives, drugs and other contraband in luggage and cargo containers. Four of his devices earned R&D 100 awards, given annually by R&D Magazine to the 100 most innovative technical products in the US.

Grodzins wrote more than 170 technical papers and held more than 60 US patents. He was a Guggenheim Fellow in 1964–65 and in 1971–72, and a Senior Alexander von Humboldt Fellow in 1980–81. He was a Fellow of the American Physical Society and the American Academy of Arts and Sciences. He received an honorary Doctor of Science degree from Purdue University in 1998, among other honors and awards. He was a founding member of the Union of Concerned Scientists and chaired it in 970 and 1972. In 1999, he founded Cornerstones of Science, a public library initiative to help children and adults explore science and served as its president; among its projects was the supply of telescopes to libraries and astronomy clubs in the US. MIT named the Lee Grodzins Postdoctoral Fellows Lecture Award for him.

== Personal life and death ==
His sister Anne Grodzins Lipow was a librarian and library science expert, and his sister Ethel was an author, project manager, CEO and co-chair of the Lyceum Society of the New York Academy of Sciences. His nephew is climate writer Joseph Romm.

Grodzins was married to Anderson for 62 years until her death in 2019; the couple had two sons. Grodzins died in Weston, Massachusetts, on March 6, 2025, at the age of 98.
