= Hans Georg Dehmelt =

German physicist (1922–2017)

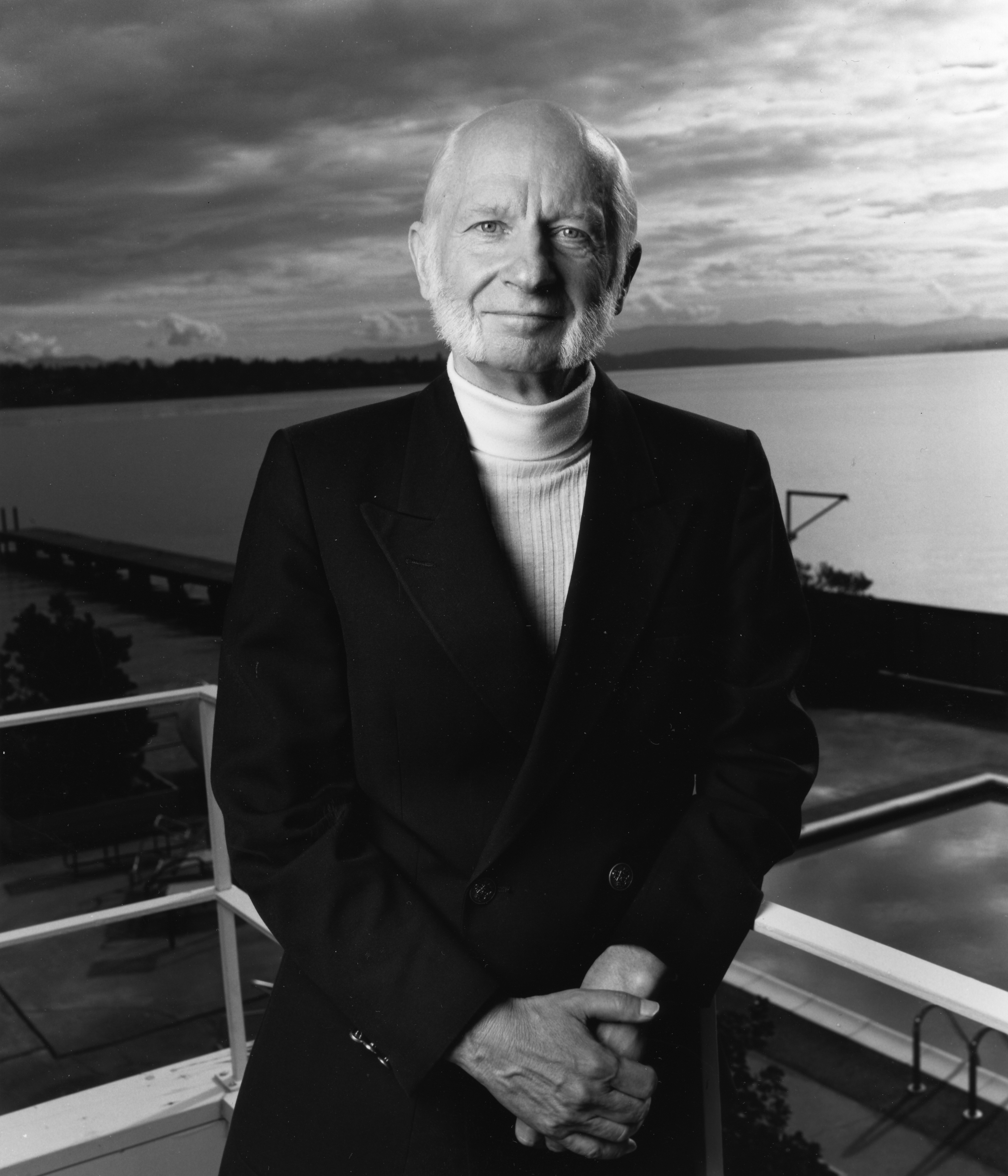
- Born: 9 September 1922; Görlitz, Germany
- Died: 7 March 2017 (aged 94); Seattle, Washington, U.S.
- Education: University of Göttingen
- Known for: Development of the ion trap Precise measurement of the electron g-factor Penning trap Laser cooling Doppler cooling Nuclear quadrupole resonance Cosmonium
- Awards: National Medal of Science (1995); Nobel Prize in Physics (1989); Rumford Prize (1985); Humboldt Prize (1974); Davisson–Germer Prize (1970)
- Scientific career
- Fields: Physics
- Workplaces: University of Washington; Duke University
- Doctoral students: David J. Wineland

Hans Georg Dehmelt (German pronunciation: [ˈhans ˈɡeːɔʁk ˈdeːml̩t]; 9 September 1922 – 7 March 2017) was a German and American physicist, who was awarded a Nobel Prize in Physics in 1989, for co-developing the ion trap technique (Penning trap) with Wolfgang Paul, for which they shared one-half of the prize (the other half of the Prize in that year was awarded to Norman Foster Ramsey). Their technique was used for high precision measurement of the electron magnetic moment.

== Biography ==
At the age of ten Dehmelt enrolled in the Berlinisches Gymnasium zum Grauen Kloster, a Latin school in Berlin, where he was admitted on a scholarship. After graduating in 1940, he volunteered for service in the German Army, which ordered him to attend the University of Breslau to study physics in 1943. After a year of study he returned to army service and was captured during the Battle of the Bulge.

After his release from an American prisoner of war camp in 1946, Dehmelt returned to his study of physics at the University of Göttingen, where he supported himself by repairing and bartering old, pre-war radio sets. He completed his master's thesis in 1948 and received his PhD in 1950, both from the University of Göttingen. He was then invited to Duke University as a postdoctoral associate, emigrating in 1952. Dehmelt became an assistant professor at the University of Washington in Seattle, Washington in 1955, an associate professor in 1958, and a full professor in 1961.

In 1955 he built his first electron impact tube in George Volkoff's laboratory at the University of British Columbia and experimented on paramagnetic resonances in polarized atoms and free electrons. In the 1960s, Dehmelt and his students worked on spectroscopy of hydrogen and helium ions. The electron was finally isolated in 1973 with David Wineland, who continued work on trapped ions at NIST.

He created the first geonium atom in 1976, which he then used to measure precise magnetic moments of the electron and positron with R. S. Van Dyck into the 1980s, work that led to his Nobel prize. In 1979 Dehmelt led a team that took the first photo of a single atom. He continued work on ion traps at the University of Washington, until his retirement in October 2002.

In May 2010, he was honoured as one of Washington's Nobel laureates by Crown Princess Victoria of Sweden at a special event in Seattle.

He was married to Irmgard Lassow, now deceased, and the couple had a son, Gerd, also deceased. In 1989 Dehmelt married Diana Dundore, a physician.

Dehmelt died on March 7, 2017, in Seattle, Washington, aged 94.

== Awards and honors ==
- Davisson-Germer Prize in 1970.
- Rumford Prize in 1985.
- Nobel Prize in Physics in 1989.
- Golden Plate Award of the American Academy of Achievement in 1990.
- National Medal of Science in 1995.
