= Mössbauer effect =

Resonant and recoil-free emission and absorption of gamma radiation by atomic nuclei

The Mössbauer effect, or recoilless nuclear resonance fluorescence, is a physical phenomenon, named after Rudolf Mössbauer who investigated it in 1958. It involves the resonant and recoil-free emission and absorption of gamma radiation by atomic nuclei bound in a solid. Its main application is in Mössbauer spectroscopy.

In the Mössbauer effect, a narrow resonance for nuclear gamma emission and absorption results from the momentum of recoil being delivered to a surrounding crystal lattice rather than to the emitting or absorbing nucleus alone. When this occurs, no gamma energy is lost to the kinetic energy of recoiling nuclei at either the emitting or absorbing end of a gamma transition: emission and absorption occur at the same energy, resulting in strong, resonant absorption.

== History ==
The interaction of X-rays with gases, particularly their attenuation and scattering, had been studied since the early years of X-ray research, and element-specific X-ray absorption phenomena had been established in the early 20th century. It was expected that a similar phenomenon would be found for gamma rays, discovered by Paul Ulrich Villard in 1900, which are created by nuclear transitions (as opposed to X-rays, which are typically produced by electronic transitions).

In 1903, Robert W. Wood investigated the phenomenon of fluorescence of sodium-vapor when exposed to sunlight, studied before by Gustav Heinrich Wiedemann. Wood noticed that the absorption spectrum was similar to the fluorescence spectrum. Wood wondered if the absorption of sodium vapor was modified by the fluorescence. This phenomeona was later termed the resonance fluorescence.

In 1929, chemist Werner Kuhn attempted to replicate the phenomena of resonance fluorescence with gamma ray sources and absorber. The experiment was a failure but he still published his results. Kuhn still theorized three properties:

1. narrow lines of gamma radiation were broadened by temperature.
2. there would be an additional small shift due to recoil due to beta decay in his sample.
3. a large shift due to the recoil of the gamma photon.

Gamma ray fluorescence was successfully detected by Philip Burton Moon in 1950 who used the relativistic Doppler effect to enhance the resonance. Moon had detected nuclear resonance fluorescence. About the same time as Moon, Karl G. Malmfors used Kuhn first prediction to increase the overlap between emitter and receiver by increasing the temperature in 1952. Both Moon and Malmfors results had large experimental errors and could not be used to devise a precise measurement technique.

In 1953, Rudolf Mössbauer was studying at the Technical University of Munich, working in the laboratory under the supervision of Heinz Maier-Leibnitz. He improved on the results of Malmfors. After completing his masters degree, Mössbauer considered that it would be easier to work at cryogenic temperature than with furnaces as Malmfors did. He was expecting to find less overlap and a reduced effect, however the resonance fluorescence was increased at low temperatures. He reasoned that he was observing recoilless emission and absorption of γ-ray photons. He later described it as follows:

this situation (is)...like a person throwing a stone from a boat. The majority of the energy is submitted to the stone, but a small amount goes into the kinetic energy of the recoiling boat. During the summer time, the boat will simply pick up this recoil energy. If, however, the person throws the stone during winter time, with the boat frozen into the lake, then practically all energy is going into the stone thrown and only a negligible amount is submitted to the boat. The entire lake will, thus, take up the recoil and this procedure occurs as recoilless rocess.

— R. Mössbauer, Hyperfine Interactions, 2000, 126, 1.

He published his results with his doctoral thesis in 1958. He soon realized that he could improve on this result by using the Doppler effect and a rotating turntable. He proceeded to make a full spectrum of the sample, inventing Mössbauer spectroscopy, which he published the same year.

Mössbauer was rewarded with half the share of the 1961 Nobel Prize in Physics "for his researches concerning the resonance absorption of gamma radiation and his discovery in this connection of the effect which bears his name", the other half went for Robert Hofstadter's research of electron scattering in atomic nuclei.

== Description ==
Mössbauer absorption spectrum of ^{57}Fe

In general, gamma rays are produced by nuclear transitions from an unstable high-energy state to a stable low-energy state. The energy of the emitted gamma ray corresponds to the energy of the nuclear transition, minus an amount of energy that is lost as recoil to the emitting atom. If the lost recoil energy is small compared with the energy linewidth of the nuclear transition, then the gamma-ray energy still corresponds to the energy of the nuclear transition and the gamma ray can be absorbed by a second atom of the same type as the first. This emission and subsequent absorption is called resonant fluorescence. Additional recoil energy is also lost during absorption, so in order for resonance to occur, the recoil energy must actually be less than half the linewidth for the corresponding nuclear transition.

The amount of energy in the recoiling body (E_{R}) can be found from momentum conservation:

$$|P_\mathrm{R}|=|P_\mathrm{\gamma} |\,$$

where P_{R} is the momentum of the recoiling matter, and P_{γ} the momentum of the gamma ray. Substituting energy into the equation gives:

$$E_\mathrm{R}=\frac{E_\mathrm{\gamma}^2}{2Mc^2}$$

where E_{R} (0.002 eV for ^{57}Fe) is the energy lost as recoil, E_{γ} is the energy of the gamma ray (14.4 keV for ^{57}Fe), M (56.9354 Da for ^{57}Fe) is the mass of the emitting or absorbing body, and c is the speed of light. In the case of a gas, the emitting and absorbing bodies are atoms, so the mass is relatively small, resulting in a large recoil energy, which prevents resonance. (The same equation applies for recoil energy losses in X-rays, but the photon energy is much less, resulting in a lower energy loss, which is why gas-phase resonance could be observed with X-rays.)

In a solid, the nuclei are bound to the lattice and do not recoil as in a gas. The lattice as a whole recoils, but the recoil energy is negligible because the M in the above equation is the mass of the entire lattice. However, the energy in a decay can be taken up or supplied by lattice vibrations. The energy of these vibrations is quantised in quasiparticles known as phonons. The Mössbauer effect occurs because there is a finite probability of a decay involving no phonons. Thus in a fraction of the nuclear events (the recoil-free fraction, given by the Lamb–Mössbauer factor), the entire crystal acts as the recoiling body, and these events are essentially recoil-free. In these cases, since the recoil energy is negligible, the emitted gamma rays have the appropriate energy and resonance can occur.

In general (depending on the half-life of the decay), gamma rays have very narrow line widths. This means they are very sensitive to small changes in the energies of nuclear transitions. In fact, gamma rays can be used as a probe to observe the effects of interactions between a nucleus and its electrons and those of its neighbors. This is the basis for Mössbauer spectroscopy, which combines the Mössbauer effect with the Doppler effect to monitor such interactions.

== Optical analogue ==
Zero-phonon optical transitions, a process closely analogous to the Mössbauer effect, can be observed in lattice-bound chromophores at low temperatures.

== See also ==
- Isomeric shift
- Mössbauer rotor experiments
- Mössbauer spectroscopy
- Nuclear spectroscopy
- Perturbed angular correlation
- Pound–Rebka experiment
