= Gertrude Scharff Goldhaber =

American nuclear physicist (1911-1998)

- Born: July 14, 1911; Mannheim, Germany
- Died: February 2, 1998 (aged 86); Patchogue, New York, U.S.
- Education: Ludwig-Maximilians-Universität München
- Spouse: Maurice Goldhaber
- Scientific career
- Fields: Physics
- Workplaces: University of Illinois 1939–1950; Brookhaven National Laboratory 1950–1979
- Doctoral advisor: Walther Gerlach

Gertrude Scharff Goldhaber (July 14, 1911 – February 2, 1998) was a German-born Jewish-American nuclear physicist. She earned her PhD from the Ludwig-Maximilians-Universität München, and though her family suffered during The Holocaust, Gertrude was able to escape to London and later to the United States. She showed that uranium undergoing spontaneous fission emits neutrons. Her research during World War II was classified, and not published until 1946. She and her husband, Maurice Goldhaber, spent most of their post-war careers at Brookhaven National Laboratory.

== Early life ==
Gertrude Scharff was born in Mannheim, Germany on July 14, 1911. She attended public school, and it is there that she developed an interest in science. Unusually for the time, her parents supported this interest — possibly because her father had wanted to be a chemist before being forced to support his family after the death of his father. Goldhaber's early life was filled with hardship. During World War I she recalled having to eat bread made partially of sawdust, and her family suffered through the hyperinflation of postwar Germany, although it did not prevent her from attending the Ludwig-Maximilians-Universität München (LMU).

== Education ==
At the LMU, Gertrude quickly developed an interest in physics. Although her family had supported her early interest in science, her father encouraged her to study law. In defense of her decision to study physics, Gertrude told her father, "I'm not interested in the law. I want to understand what the world is made of."

As was usual for students at the time, Gertrude spent semesters at various other universities including the University of Freiburg, the University of Zurich, and the Friedrich Wilhelm University of Berlin (where she would meet her future husband). Upon returning to the LMU, Gertrude took up a position with Walter Gerlach to perform her thesis research. In her thesis, Gertrude studied the effects of stress on magnetization. After completing her Ph.D. in 1935, she fled to London. Her first article, on the effect of stress on magnetization above the Curie point, from her thesis, was published in 1936.

With the rise to power of the Nazi party in 1933, Gertrude faced increasing difficulties in Germany because of her Jewish heritage. During this time her father was arrested and jailed, and although he and his wife were able to flee to Switzerland upon his release, they later returned to Germany and were unable to return to Switzerland, and were murdered in the Holocaust. Her sister Liselotte, however, was able to escape to France.

== Career ==
For the first six months of her stay in London, Gertrude lived off the money she made from selling her Leica camera, as well as money earned from translating German to English. Gertrude found that having a Ph.D. was a disadvantage as there were more spots for refugee students than for refugee scientists. She wrote to 35 other refugee scientists looking for work, and was told by all but one that there were already too many refugee scientists already working. Only Maurice Goldhaber wrote back offering any hope, stating that he thought she might be able to find work in Cambridge. Gertrude was able to find work in George Paget Thomson's lab working on electron diffraction. Although she had a post-doctoral position with Thomson, Gertrude realized that she was not going to be offered a real position with him and so looked for other work.

In 1939, Gertrude married Maurice Goldhaber. She then moved to Urbana, Illinois to join him at the University of Illinois. The state of Illinois had strict anti-nepotism laws at the time which prevented Gertrude Goldhaber from being hired by the university because her husband already had a position there. Gertrude was granted neither salary nor laboratory space, and worked in Maurice's lab as an unpaid assistant. Since Maurice's lab was only set up for nuclear physics research, Gertrude Goldhaber took up research in that field as well. During this time Gertrude and Maurice Goldhaber had two sons: Alfred and Michael. Goldhaber was eventually given a soft-money line by the department to help support her research.

In 1950, the couple moved from Illinois to Long Island where they both joined the staff of Brookhaven National Laboratory. At the laboratory she founded a series of monthly lectures known as the Brookhaven Lecture Series which is still continuing as of September 2026.

Scharff-Goldhaber was an active member of the American Physical Society (APS). She participated in committees devoted to the status of women in physics and pre-college physics education. She reached early career scientists, both men and women. Rosalyn Sussman Yalow, who was awarded the 1977 Nobel Prize in Physiology or Medicine thanked Scharff-Goldhaber "for support and encouragement."

Due to retirement laws of the time, she officially ended her employment in 1977, but continued to work unpaid until 1988.

== Research ==
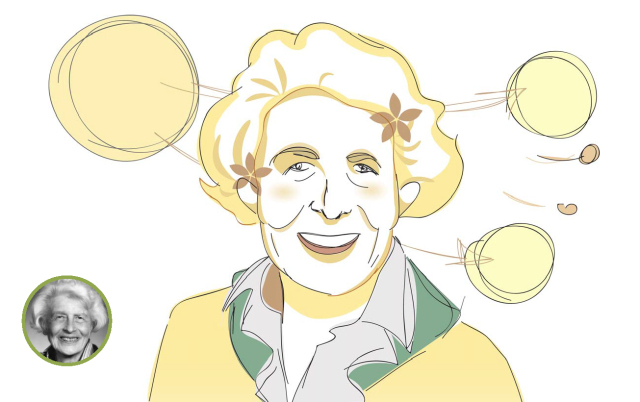

Goldhaber studied neutron-proton and neutron-nucleus reaction cross sections in 1941, and gamma radiation emission and absorption by nuclei in 1942. Around this time she also observed that spontaneous nuclear fission is accompanied by the release of neutrons — a result that had been theorized earlier but had yet to be shown. Her work with spontaneous nuclear fission was classified during the war, and was only published after the war ended in 1946.

In 1948, the Goldhabers devised an experiment to confirm that beta particles were identical to the electron based on the Pauli exclusion principle.

In the 1950s, Scharff-Goldhaber research on nuclei helped resolved inconsistencies between the liquid drop model the nuclear shell model and connected the two approaches. She also measured the energy of excited nuclei as a function of neutron number, demonstrating that shell structure influenced the energy, with maxima at the magic numbers. She tied anomalies in this relation to different shapes of the nuclei. Her theory became known as the variable moment of inertia (VMI) model which tied the shape of nuclei to their spectrum.

Before computer graphics, she produced one of the earliest 3D plots of the table of nuclides, by gluing vertical rods of length proportional to the lowest excitation energy of a physical board.

== Awards and honors ==
- 1947 — elected as a fellow of the American Physical Society
- 1972 — elected to National Academy of Sciences (the third female physicist to be so honored)
- 1982 — Long Island Achiever's Award in Science
- 1984 — Phi Beta Kappa visiting scholar
- 1990 — Outstanding Woman Scientist Award from the New York Chapter of the Association for Women Scientists

In 2001, Brookhaven National Laboratory created the Gertrude and Maurice Goldhaber Distinguished Fellowships in her honor. These prestigious Fellowships are awarded to early-career scientists with exceptional talent and credentials who have a strong desire for independent research at the frontiers of their fields.

== Bibliography ==
- Bond, Peter D.; Henley, Ernest (1999), Gertrude Scharff Goldhaber 1911-1998: A Biographical Memoir (PDF), Biographical Memoirs, vol. 77, Washington, D.C.: The National Academy Press, archived from the original (PDF) on November 22, 2004
- "Brookhaven Lecture Series". Brookhaven National Laboratory. July 2, 2008. Archived from the original on February 17, 2005.
- Goldhaber, Maurice (2001), Gertrude Scharff Goldhaber, Contributions of 20th Century Women to Physics, University of California, Los Angeles
- Saxon, Wolfgang (February 6, 1998), "Gertrude Scharff Goldhaber, 86, Crucial Scientist in Nuclear Fission", The New York Times, pp. D18
