= Cosmon =

Hypothetical form of matter

- Excerpt of 1989 paper by Hans Dehmelt
- Status: Hypothetical
- Theorized: 1956, Maurice Goldhaber

In physical cosmology, a cosmon or cosmonium is a hypothetical form of early matter. It was introduced by Maurice Goldhaber in 1956. Various attempts to modernize this theory have been proposed since the 1980s.

== Original proposal ==
Georges Lemaître originally suggested the concept of a "primeval atom" (French: atome primitif) 1946, leading up to the theory of the Big Bang. He illustrated the idea by imagining an object 30 times larger than the volume of the sun containing all the matter of the Universe. Its density would be around $10^{15}\text{g cm}^{-3}$. In his view, this occurred somewhere between 20 and 60 billion years ago.

The idea of a primeval “super-atom” lived on and was further developed by Maurice Goldhaber in 1956. In his proposal, there would have been a point, which had been called a universon, that would have collapsed into a cosmon and anti-cosmon pair. Goldhaber's theory suffered from the fact that matter existed at all if equal amounts of matter and antimatter were formed in the Big Bang. One explanation for this is the asymmetry of matter, meaning that there could have been slightly more matter than antimatter, for instance 1001 matter particles to every 1000 antimatter. In Goldhaber's model, the cosmon and anticosmon would have flown apart, therefore explaining the issue without asymmetry.

== Modern theories ==
In 1987, Roberto Peccei, Joan Solà and Christof Wetterich introduced a cosmon model to explain the cosmological constant problem.

In 1989, Hans Dehmelt attempted to modernize the idea of the primeval atom. In this hypothesis, cosmonium would have been the heaviest form of matter at the beginning of the Big Bang.
