= Maurice Goldhaber =

American physicist (1911–2011)

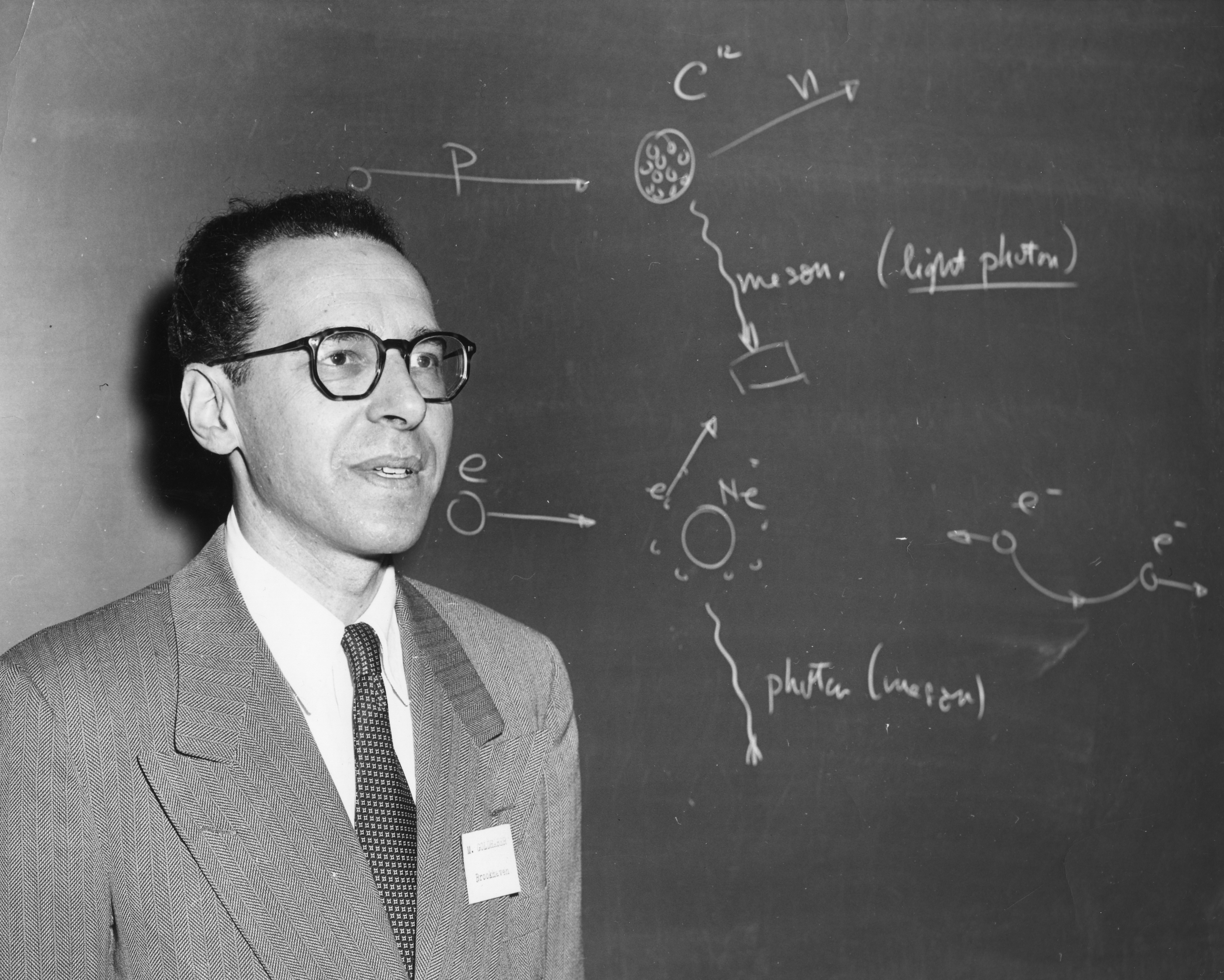
- Goldhaber in 1958
- Born: April 18, 1911; Lemberg, Austria-Hungary (now Lviv, Ukraine)
- Died: May 11, 2011 (aged 100); East Setauket, New York, U.S.
- Education: University of Berlin; Cambridge University
- Known for: Mass of the neutron Goldhaber experiment Cosmon
- Spouse: Gertrude Scharff Goldhaber
- Relatives: Gerson Goldhaber (brother)
- Awards: Tom W. Bonner Prize in Nuclear Physics (1971); National Medal of Science (1983); Wolf Prize in Physics (1991); J. Robert Oppenheimer Memorial Prize (1982); Fermi Award (1998)
- Scientific career
- Fields: Physics
- Workplaces: Cavendish Laboratory, Brookhaven National Laboratory
- Doctoral advisor: James Chadwick
- Doctoral students: Theodore A. Welton

Maurice Goldhaber (April 18, 1911 – May 11, 2011) was an American physicist and director of Brookhaven National Laboratory. He is known for the discovery that deuteron is made of a neutron and a proton, for first measuring the mass of the neutron and for the Goldhaber experiment that first determined that neutrinos have negative helicity.

== Early life and childhood ==
He was born on April 18, 1911, in Lemberg, Austria, now called Lviv, Ukraine, to a Jewish family. His great-grandfather Gershon Goldhaber was a rabbi.

After beginning his physics studies at the University of Berlin, he earned his doctorate at Magdalene College, Cambridge, in 1936.

== Career ==
In 1934, working at the Cavendish Laboratory in Cambridge, England, he and James Chadwick, through what they called the nuclear photo-electric effect, established that the neutron has a great enough mass over the proton to decay. They showed that the neutron was a new nucleon and measured for the first time the mass of the neutron.

He moved to the University of Illinois in 1938. In 1948, with his wife Gertrude Scharff Goldhaber, he devised an experiment to confirm that beta particles are identical to electrons based on Pauli exclusion principle.

He joined Brookhaven National Laboratory in 1950. With Edward Teller he proposed that the so-called "giant-dipole nuclear resonance" was due to the neutrons in a nucleus vibrating as a group against the protons as a group (Goldhaber–Teller model).

Goldhaber made a well-known bet with Hartland Snyder in about 1955 that anti-protons could not exist; which he lost. After that, in 1956 he speculated that the reason anti-matter does not appear to be abundant in the universe is that before the Big Bang, a single particle, the "universon" existed that then decayed into cosmon and anti-cosmon, and that the cosmon subsequently decayed to produce the known cosmos.

In 1956, Goldhaber also speculated that strange particles were composites of just three basic particles, this model became known as the Goldhaber–Christy model (named after Goldhaber and Robert F. Christy who published independently). He also proposed that all fermions such as electrons, protons and neutrons have doublets, that is that each is associated with a similar heavier particle.

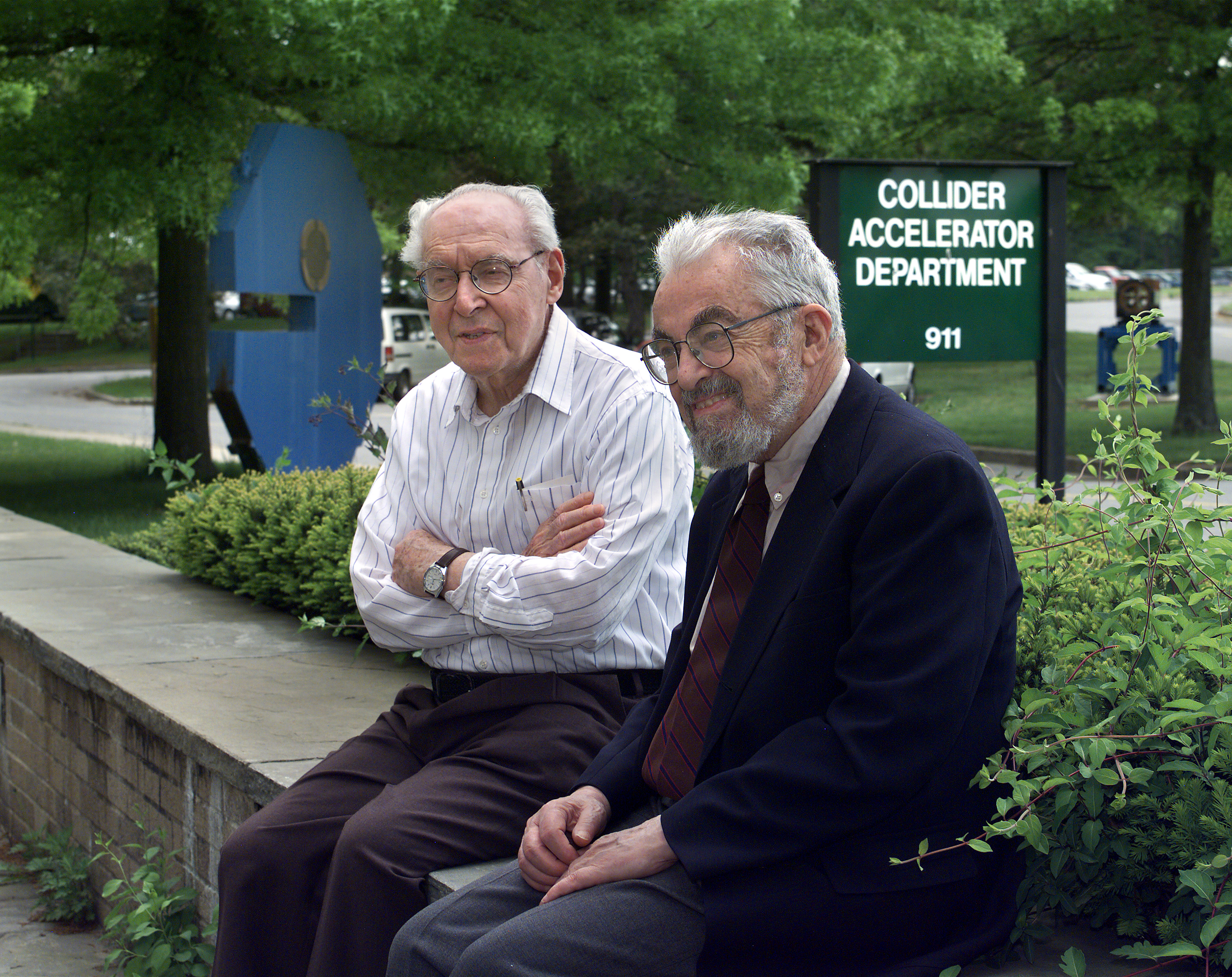
Maurice Goldhaber (left) and Ernest Courant in 2000 in front of the C-shaped Cosmotron magnet that sits outside Building 911, home to Brookhaven Lab's Collider Accelerator Department

The 1957 Goldhaber experiment with Lee Grodzins and Andrew Sunyar established that neutrinos have negative helicity.

Goldhaber was Director of Brookhaven National Laboratory from 1961 to 1973.

== Personal life and family ==
Goldhaber's wife, the physicist Gertrude Scharff Goldhaber, also spent most of her career at Brookhaven. His brother, Gerson Goldhaber, was a professor of physics at the University of California, Berkeley; his son, Alfred Scharff Goldhaber (1940-2024), was a professor of physics at the C. N. Yang Institute for Theoretical Physics at Stony Brook University; his grandson (son of Alfred), David Goldhaber-Gordon, is a professor of physics at Stanford.

Goldhaber died May 11, 2011, at his home in East Setauket, New York, at 100.

== Honors and awards ==
Among his many other awards, he won the National Medal of Science in 1983, the Golden Plate Award of the American Academy of Achievement in 1985, the J. Robert Oppenheimer Memorial Prize in 1982 (shared with Robert Marshak), the Wolf Prize in 1991, shared with Valentine Telegdi "for their separate seminal contributions to nuclear and particle physics, particularly those concerning the weak interactions involving leptons", and the Fermi Award in 1998. He was an elected member of the United States National Academy of Sciences, the American Academy of Arts and Sciences, and the American Philosophical Society. Although never a Nobel laureate, he was nominated in 1962 by Otto Struve for the Nobel Prize in Physics.

In 2001, Brookhaven National Laboratory created the Gertrude and Maurice Goldhaber Distinguished Fellowships in his honor. These Fellowships are awarded to early-career scientists with exceptional talent and credentials who have a strong desire for independent research at the frontiers of their fields.
