= Valentine Telegdi =

American physicist

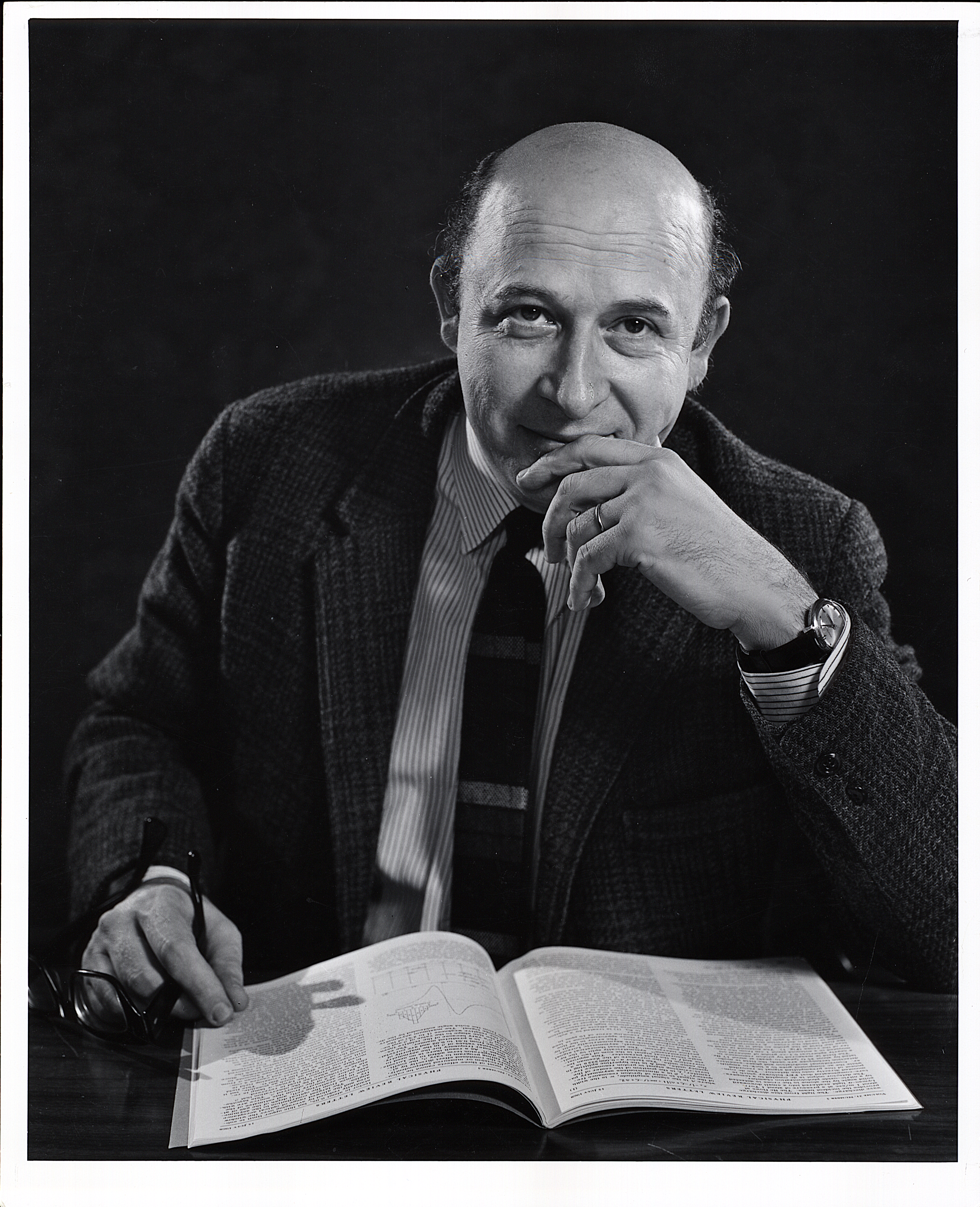
- Telegdi between 1976 and 1980
- Born: Valentine Louis Telegdi; January 11, 1922; Budapest, Hungary
- Died: April 8, 2006 (aged 84); Pasadena, California, United States
- Awards: Wolf Prize in Physics (1991); Lilienfeld Prize (1995); ForMemRS; United States National Academy of Sciences member (1968)
- Scientific career
- Workplaces: University of Chicago; ETH Zürich; CERN; California Institute of Technology
- Doctoral advisor: Paul Scherrer and Wolfgang Pauli

Valentine Louis "Val" Telegdi (Hungarian: Telegdi Bálint; 11 January 1922 – April 8, 2006) was a Hungarian-American physicist.

== Biography ==
Valentine Telegdi was born in 1922 in Budapest, Hungary, in a Jewish family. His father, Georges, was from Pécs, Hungary, while his mother, Ella Csillag, was from Békéscsaba. His father studied commerce in Budapest, and went to Paris after graduation. He was detained as an enemy alien during the war, and returned to Budapest after five years. Several years later, finding the life in Hungary under Bela Kun to be difficult, he found a job for a transportation company in Bulgaria. His mother returned to Budapest to give birth. Valentine spent his early childhood in Bulgaria and Romania, and returned to Hungary in 1928. In 1932, the family moved to Vienna. Val was interested in science, and at 13 received a chemistry set as a gift. After a minor incident his parents forbade chemistry experiments at home. In Vienna, Telegdi studied at the Lehr- und Versuchsanstalt für chemische Industrie, which trained laboratory technicians. Telegdi was left in Vienna to live with boarding families when his parents moved to Italy. He was in Milan on vacation in 1938, when the Anschluss of Austria happened.

Telegdi continued his education at Bergamo and then Brussels. Belgium was occupied when he studied there, but as a Hungarian citizen he was able to leave the country for Italy. His father left for Switzerland, but Val with his mother stayed in Italy. There, he first earned a living doing technical translations, and later started to work at a patent office. He had a good salary, and, at 21 years old, his own secretary. In 1943, he and his mother illegally crossed Swiss border, and after a short internment joined Georges in Lausanne.

Telegdi enrolled to the University of Lausanne and got a degree in chemical engineering and physical chemistry. He became interested in physics, and with the help from Ernst Stueckelberg was admitted to ETH Zurich in 1946. He started to work with Paul Scherrer, and later with Wolfgang Pauli. Both Scherrer and Pauli became his thesis supervisors.

Victor Weisskopf recommended Telegdi to Enrico Fermi, and he joined the University of Chicago in 1951. There Telegdi made major contributions to understanding weak interactions and symmetry violations. His 1957 experiment with Jerome Friedman using nuclear emulsions independently confirmed parity non-conservation, though a controversial publication delay caused lasting frustration. He became so identified with muon research—studying muon capture, muonium properties, and the muon's magnetic moment—that colleagues called him "Mr. Muon". With Valentine Bargmann and Louis Michel, he developed the BMT equation for relativistic spin precession. In 1972, Chicago named him the first Enrico Fermi Distinguished Service Professor.

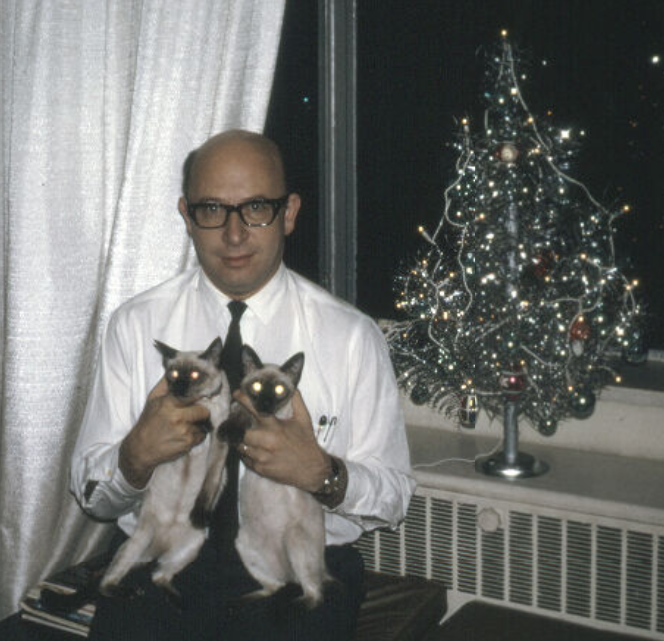
Val Telegdi with cats, December 1965

Telegdi left Chicago in 1976 for positions at ETH Zurich and CERN, where he later chaired the Scientific Policy Committee. He and his wife Lidia, whom he had met in Zurich in 1947, settled in Geneva. After retiring from ETH in 1981 he divided his time between CERN and the California Institute of Technology. Telegdi chaired CERN's scientific policy committee from 1981 to 1983. He was chair of the International Committee for Future Accelerators, a working group of the International Union of Pure and Applied Physics, from 1983 to 1986.

According to György Marx he was one of The Martians. Telegdi was fluent in Hungarian, German, Italian, and English, but had strong accent only in English. Known for incisive criticism and demanding intellectual standards reminiscent of Wolfgang Pauli, Telegdi earned a reputation as a "conscience of physics". He died on 8 April 2006.

== Awards and honours ==
Telegdi was elected to the National Academy of Sciences in 1968. In 1991 he shared the Wolf Prize in Physics with Maurice Goldhaber "for their separate seminal contributions to nuclear and particle physics, particularly those concerning the weak interactions involving leptons". He was elected a Foreign Member of the Royal Society (ForMemRS) in 2003.
