= Philip Burton Moon =

British nuclear physicist

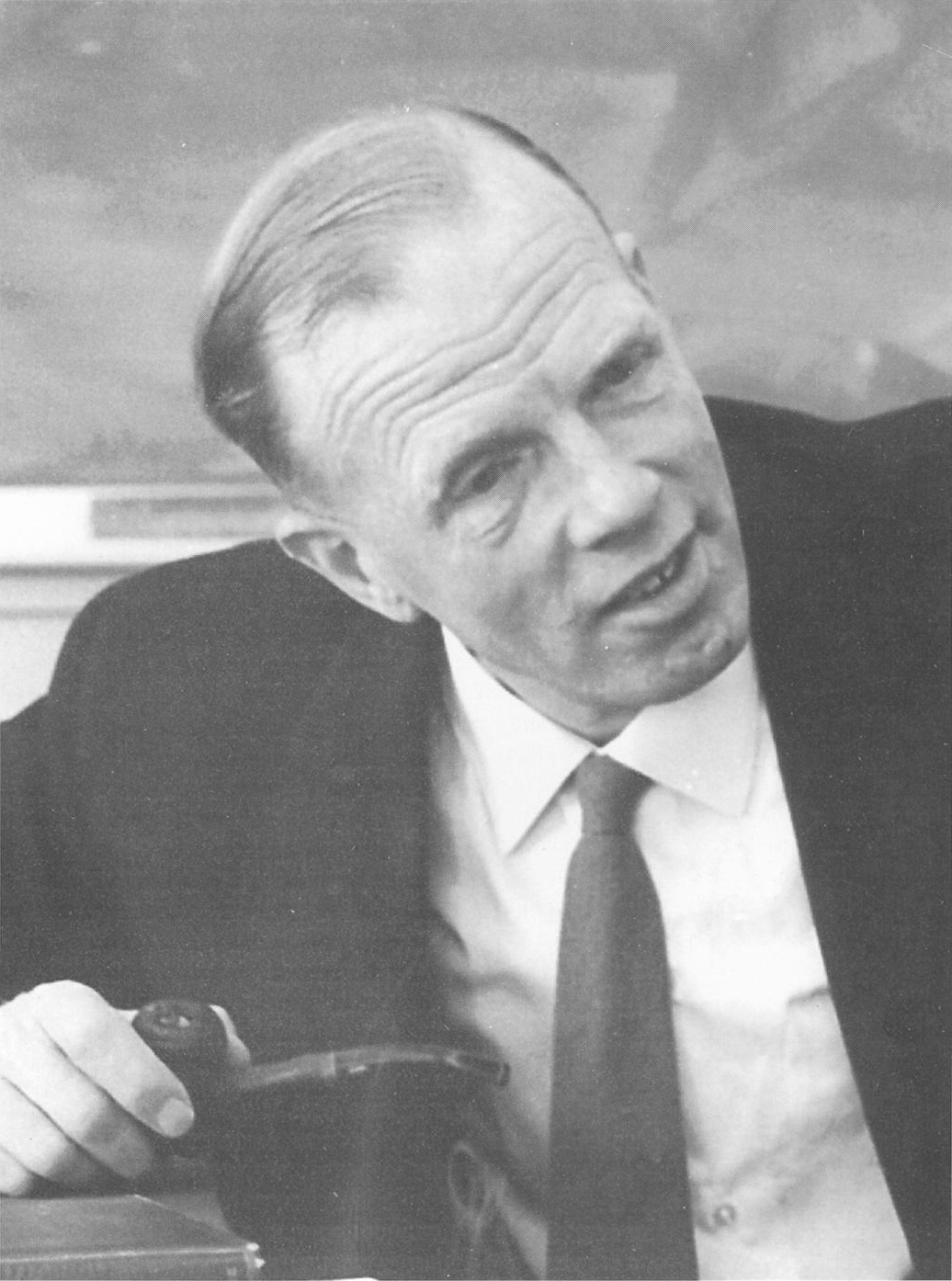
- Moon in Los Alamos in 1964
- Born: 17 May 1907; Lewisham, London, England
- Died: 9 October 1994 (aged 87)
- Education: Sidney Sussex College, Cambridge; Cavendish Laboratory
- Known for: Tube Alloys; Manhattan Project; Gamma ray fluorescence development of atomic bomb 'Oliphant's satellite'
- Awards: Hughes Medal (1991); Fellow of the Royal Society
- Scientific career
- Fields: Nuclear physics
- Workplaces: University of Cambridge; Imperial College, London; Birmingham University; Cavendish Laboratory; University of Birmingham
- Doctoral advisor: Ernest Rutherford
- Other academic advisors: Sir Mark Oliphant
- Doctoral students: Noor Muhammad Butt

Philip Burton Moon FRS (17 May 1907 – 9 October 1994) was a British nuclear physicist. He is most remembered for his research work in atomic physics and nuclear physics. He is one of the British scientists who participated in the United States' Manhattan Project, Britain's Tube Alloys, and was involved in nuclear weapon development. Moon made outstanding and original experimental contributions which stimulated the development of whole fields of research involving neutrons, gamma rays and novel methods of studying chemical reactions ('Mechanically propelled molecular beams: techniques and opportunities', Moon, P.B. Ralls, M.P., Proceedings of the Royal Society A, 423, 361 371, 1989).

== Early life and education ==
Philip Burton Moon was born in 1907, attended Leyton Sixth Form College, and in 1925 entered Sidney Sussex College, Cambridge. He became a research student in the Cavendish Laboratory under Ernest Rutherford. From 1928 to 1931 he worked with Mark Oliphant on the collision of atoms with solids. Rutherford called him "Oliphant's satellite" and that influence remained with him for decades.

=== Cavendish Laboratory ===
He worked at Cavendish Laboratory in the mid-1930s, where he shared a room with Australian physicist Mark Oliphant. Both later joined the University of Birmingham; Moon in 1938.

== Tube Alloys and Manhattan Project ==
During World War II Moon was part of the MAUD Committee that confirmed the feasibility of an atomic bomb and then became part of the British delegation to the Manhattan Project, where amongst other things he did work on designing instrumentation for measuring the eventual bomb test.

His wife, Winifred Moon, was a staff worker at Los Alamos during the Manhattan Project.

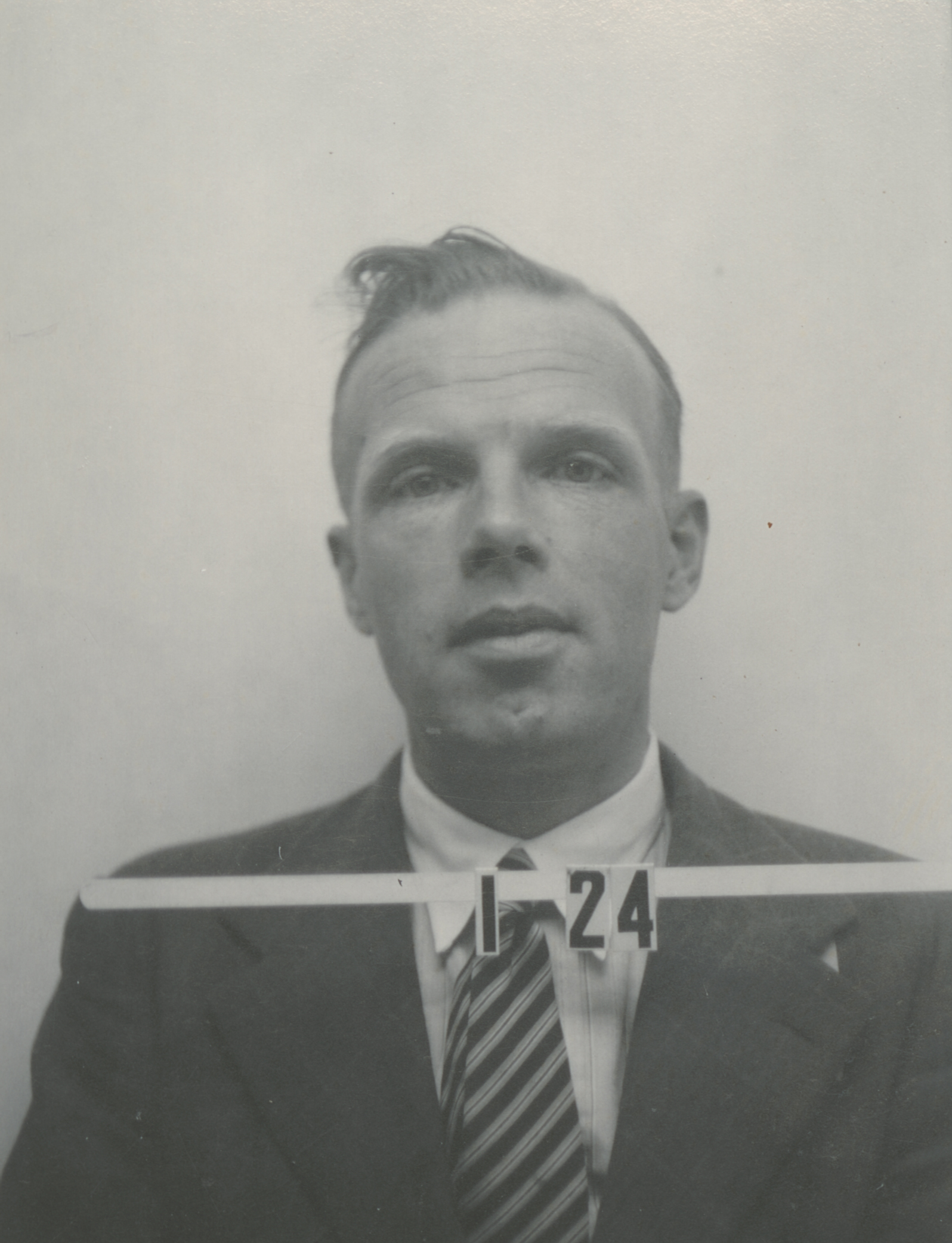
Philip Moon's Los Alamos badge

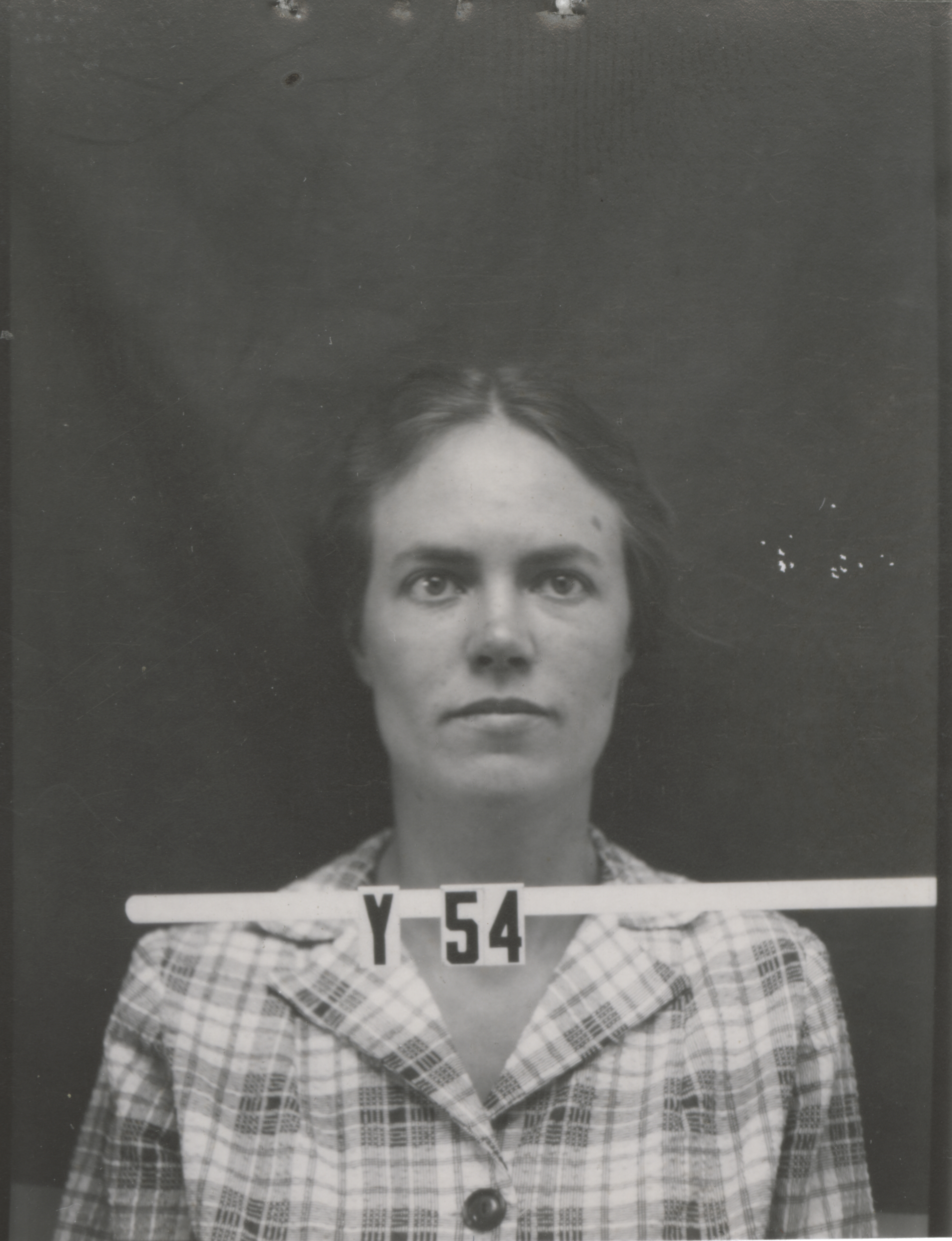
Winifred Moon's Los Alamos badge

== Career at Birmingham University ==
After the war he was made Poynting Professor of Physics at Birmingham in 1946, succeeding Oliphant but receiving the appointment only after the first choice (Cecil Powell) had been rejected at the last minute for being a communist. He held the position until 1973.

In 1950 Moon was the first person to detect gamma ray fluorescence; however his results were not considered statistically significant enough and it would be several years before they were proven.

Moon was invited to become the honorary life president of the Poynting Physical Society, at the University of Birmingham, in 1975.

In 1991, Moon was the recipient of the Hughes Medal from the Royal Society.

His papers are held at the University of Birmingham Special Collections.
