= Nuclear resonance fluorescence =

Process in which a nucleus absorbs and emits gamma rays

Nuclear resonance fluorescence (NRF) is a nuclear process in which a nucleus absorbs and emits high-energy photons called gamma rays. NRF interactions typically take place above 1 MeV, and most NRF experiments target heavy nuclei such as uranium and thorium. It is the analogous of the atomic resonance fluorescence for nuclear spectra.

At low temperatures, when nuclei do not recoil after the emission of the photon, the phenomenon is known the Mössbauer effect.

== Description ==
Nuclear resonance fluorescence reactions are the result of nuclear absorption and subsequent emission of high-energy photons (gamma rays). As a gamma ray strikes the nucleus, the nucleus becomes excited (that is, the nuclear system as a quantum mechanical ensemble is put into a state with a higher energy). Much like electronic excitation, the nucleus will decay toward its ground state, releasing a high-energy photon at a number of possible, discrete energies. Thus, NRF can be quantified using spectroscopy. Nuclei can be identified by the distinct pattern of NRF emission peaks, although NRF analysis is much less straightforward than typical electronic emissions.

As the energy of incident photons increases, the average spacing between nuclear energy levels decreases. For sufficiently energetic nuclei (i.e. incident photons of over ~1 MeV), the mean spacing between energy levels may be lower than the mean width of each NRF resonance. At this point, determinations of peak spacing cannot be analytical, and must rely on specialized applications of the statistical methods of signal processing.

== Applications ==
This process is used for scanning cargo for contraband. Its far more effective than just using x-rays because x-rays can only see the shape of the item in question. With nuclear resonance fluorescence its possible to see what the molecular structure is and thus, distinguish between salt and cocaine without even opening the container.
