= Multipolarity of gamma radiation =

Electric dipole radiation. The dipole lies in the plane of the drawing, points vertically upward and oscillates with about 1 Hz. The colour indicates the strength of the field travelling outward. The magnetic field lines are perpendicular to the plane of the drawing.

Transitions between excited states (or excited states and the ground state) of a nuclide lead to the emission of gamma quanta. These can be classified by their multipolarity. There are two kinds: electric and magnetic multipole radiation. Each of these, being electromagnetic radiation, consists of an electric and a magnetic field.

== Multipole radiation ==
Electric dipole, quadrupole, octupole, etc. radiation (generally: 2^{$\ell$}-pole radiation) is also designated as E1, E2, E3, etc. radiation (generally: E$\ell$ radiation). (Note: The symbol $\ell$ is used here to distinguish the letter "el" clearly from the numeral "one".)

Similarly, magnetic dipole, quadrupole, octupole, etc. radiation (generally: 2^{$\ell$}-pole radiation) is designated as M1, M2, M3, etc. radiation (generally: M$\ell$ radiation).

There is no monopole radiation ($\ell= 0$).

In quantum mechanics, angular momentum is quantized. The various multipole fields have particular values of angular momentum: E$\ell$ radiation carries angular momentum of $\ell$ħ; likewise, M$\ell$ radiation carries angular momentum $\ell$ħ. The conservation of angular momentum leads to selection rules, i.e., rules defining which multipoles may or may not be emitted in particular transitions.

To make a simple classical comparison, consider the figure of the oscillating dipole. It produces electric field lines travelling outwards, intertwined with magnetic field lines, according to Maxwell's equations. This system of field lines then corresponds to that of E1 radiation. Similar considerations hold for oscillating electric or magnetic multipoles of higher order.

Conversely, it is plausible that the multipolarity of radiation can be determined from the angular distribution of the emitted radiation.

== Quantum numbers and selection rules ==
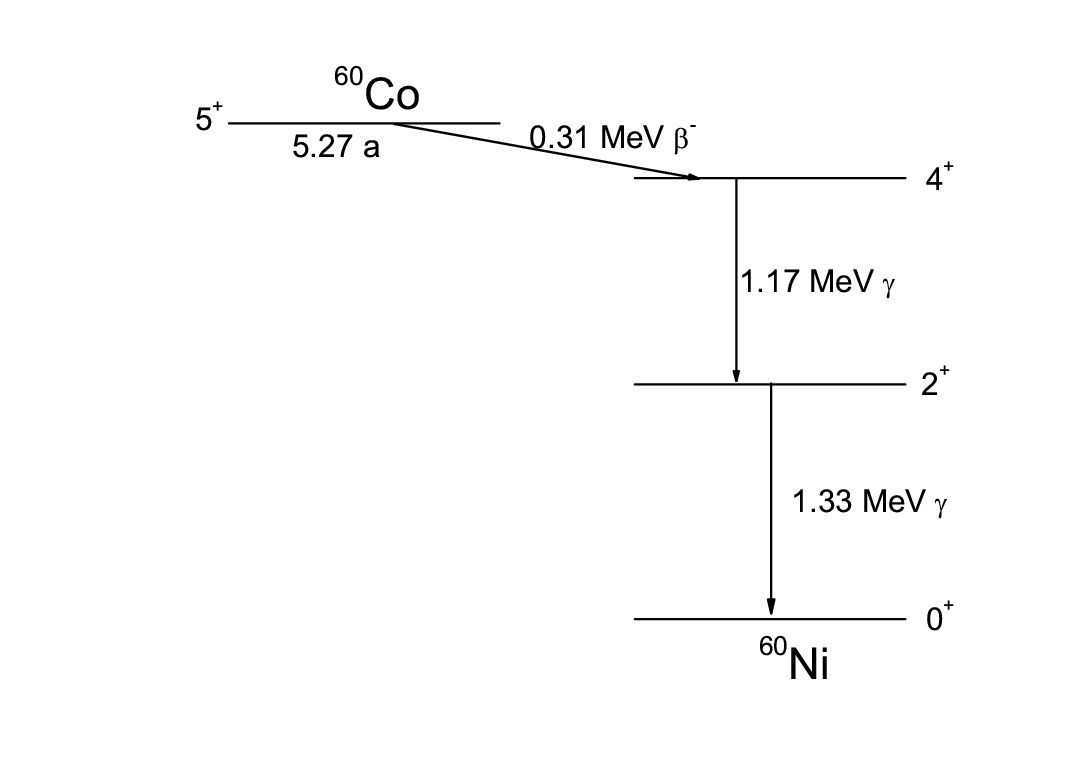
Simplified decay scheme of ^{60}Co, with angular momenta and parities shown

A state of a nuclide is described by its energy above the ground state, by its angular momentum J, and by its parity, i.e., its behaviour under reflection (positive or even: +; negative or odd: −). Since the spin of nucleons is 1/2ħ, and since orbital angular momentum is an integer multiple of ħ, J may be an integer or a half integer multiple of ħ.

Electric and magnetic multipole radiations of the same order $\ell$ (i.e., dipole, quadrupole, etc.) carry the same angular momentum $\ell$ħ, but differ in parity. The following relations hold for $\ell$ > 0:

- Electric multipole radiation: parity (−1)^{${\ell}$}:
  Here, the electric field has parity (−1)^{${\ell}$}, and the magnetic field has parity (−1)^{$\ell$}.
- Magnetic multipole radiation: parity (−1)^{${\ell}$+1}:
  Here, the electric field has parity (−1)^{${\ell}$+1}, and the magnetic field has parity (−1)^{$\ell$+1}.

The designation "electric multipole radiation" seems appropriate since the major part of that radiation is produced by the charge density in the source; conversely, the "magnetic multipole radiation" is mainly due to the current density of the source.

In electric multipole radiation, the electric field has a radial component; in magnetic multipole radiation, the magnetic field has a radial component.

An example: in the simplified decay scheme of ^{60}Co above, the angular momenta and the parities of the various states are shown. Consider the 1.33 MeV transition to the ground state. Clearly, this must carry away an angular momentum of 2ħ, without change of parity. It is therefore an E2 transition. The case of the 1.17 MeV transition is a bit more complicated: going from J = 4ħ to J = 2ħ, all values of angular momentum from 2ħ to 6ħ could be emitted. But in practice, the smallest values are most likely, so it is also a quadrupole transition, and it is E2 since there is no parity change.

== See also ==
- Multipole expansion
