= 2752 Wu Chien-Shiung =

Asteroid

Discovery
- Discovered by: Purple Mountain Obs.
- Discovery site: Purple Mountain Obs.
- Discovery date: 20 September 1965

Designations
- Named after: Chien-Shiung Wu (Chinese-American physicist)
- Alternative designations: 1965 SP · 1933 QW; 1960 VA · 1970 RD; 1978 EG_{7} · 1979 HN_{4} 1981 TO_{4} · 1981 UY_{9}
- Minor planet category: main-belt · (outer); Eos

Orbital characteristics
- Epoch 23 March 2018 (JD 2458200.5)
- Uncertainty parameter 0
- Observation arc: 84.18 yr (30,746 d)
- Aphelion: 3.3585 AU
- Perihelion: 2.6878 AU
- Semi-major axis: 3.0231 AU
- Eccentricity: 0.1109
- Orbital period (sidereal): 5.26 yr (1,920 d)
- Mean anomaly: 340.43°
- Mean motion: 0° 11^{m} 15^{s} / day
- Inclination: 10.132°
- Longitude of ascending node: 186.31°
- Argument of perihelion: 198.82°

Physical characteristics
- Mean diameter: 15.484±0.203 km 16.65±1.18 km 17.80 km (calculated)
- Synodic rotation period: 36.343±0.5196 h
- Geometric albedo: 0.14 (assumed); 0.184±0.028; 0.203±0.024
- Spectral type: S (assumed)
- Absolute magnitude (H): 11.40; 11.5; 12.096±0.001 (S)

2752 Wu Chien-Shiung, provisional designation 1965 SP, is an Eoan asteroid from the outer regions of the asteroid belt, approximately 16 kilometers (10 miles) in diameter. It was discovered on 20 September 1965, by astronomers at Purple Mountain Observatory in Nanking, China. The asteroid has a long rotation period of 36.3 hours. It was named for Chinese-American nuclear physicist Chien-Shiung Wu.

== Orbit and classification ==
Wu Chien-Shiung is a core member of the Eos family (606), one of the largest asteroid families named after 221 Eos. It orbits the Sun in the outer main-belt at a distance of 2.7–3.4 AU once every 5 years and 3 months (1,920 days; semi-major axis of 3.02 AU). Its orbit has an eccentricity of 0.11 and an inclination of 10° with respect to the ecliptic.

The asteroid was first observed as 1933 QW at Heidelberg Observatory in August 1933. The body's observation arc begins as 1960 VA at the Goethe Link Observatory in November 1960, or 5 years prior to its official discovery observation at Nanking.

== Physical characteristics ==
Wu Chien-Shiung is an assumed S-type asteroid, while the overall spectral type for members of the Eos family is that of a K-type.

=== Rotation period ===
In August 2012, a rotational lightcurve of Wu Chien-Shiung was obtained from photometric observations in the S-band by astronomers with the Palomar Transient Factory in California. Lightcurve analysis gave a long rotation period of 36.343 hours with a brightness amplitude of 0.28 magnitude (U=2). While not being a slow rotator with spin rates above 100 hours, Wu Chien-Shiung's period is significantly longer than the average 2 to 20 hours observed for most asteroids.

=== Diameter and albedo ===
According to the surveys carried out by the Japanese Akari satellite and the NEOWISE mission of NASA's Wide-field Infrared Survey Explorer, Wu Chien-Shiung measures 15.484 and 16.65 kilometers in diameter and its surface has an albedo of 0.203 and 0.184, respectively, while the Collaborative Asteroid Lightcurve Link assumes a standard albedo for K-type asteroids of 0.14 – derived from the Eos family's parent body – and calculates a diameter of 17.80 kilometers based on an absolute magnitude of 11.5.

== Naming ==
This minor planet was named after Chinese-American nuclear physicist Chien-Shiung Wu (1912–1997), renowned for her research on the separation of uranium isotopes by gaseous diffusion and for the Wu experiment conducted in 1956, for which she was awarded a Wolf Prize in Physics in 1978 (also see list of laureates).

The official naming citation was published by the Minor Planet Center on 11 March 1990 (M.P.C. 16040).
