= Ernest Ambler =

British-American physicist

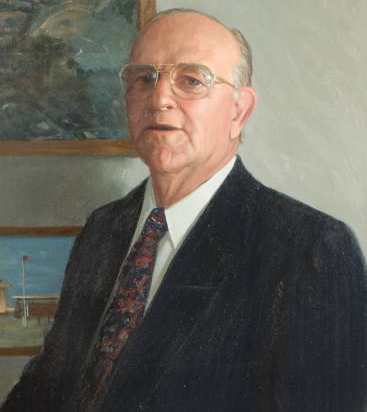
- an official U.S. government portrait of Ernest Ambler

8th Director of the National Bureau of Standards
- In office 1977–1989
- President: Jimmy Carter
- Preceded by: Richard W. Roberts
- Succeeded by: John W. Lyons

Personal details
- Born: November 20, 1923 Bradford, England, UK
- Died: February 17, 2017 (aged 93) Hilton Head, South Carolina, US
- Citizenship: British; American
- Spouse: Alice Virginia Seiler
- Children: two sons
- Education: University of Oxford
- Awards: President's Award for Distinguished Federal Civilian Service; Order of Civil Merit (Korea)
- Scientific career
- Fields: Physics
- Workplaces: National Bureau of Standards

Ernest Ambler (November 20, 1923 – February 17, 2017) was a British-American physicist who served as the Acting Under Secretary for Technology in the Department of Commerce (1988–89), as the 8th director of the United States' National Bureau of Standards (NBS, 1975–89), and as the first director of the United States' National Institute of Standards and Technology 1988–89.

== Early life and education ==
Ernest Ambler was born in Bradford, England, in 1923. He received his Bachelor of Arts degree from the University of Oxford and went on to earn a D.Phil degree in 1953 from the same institution.

== Career ==
In 1953 Ambler began work in the Cryogenic Physics Section of the United States' National Bureau of Standards, becoming section chief in 1961. In his early years at the NBS, Ambler was principal collaborator with Chien-Shiung Wu on what became the Wu experiment. He was awarded a Guggenheim Fellowship in 1962. He was elected a Fellow of the American Physical Society in 1958.

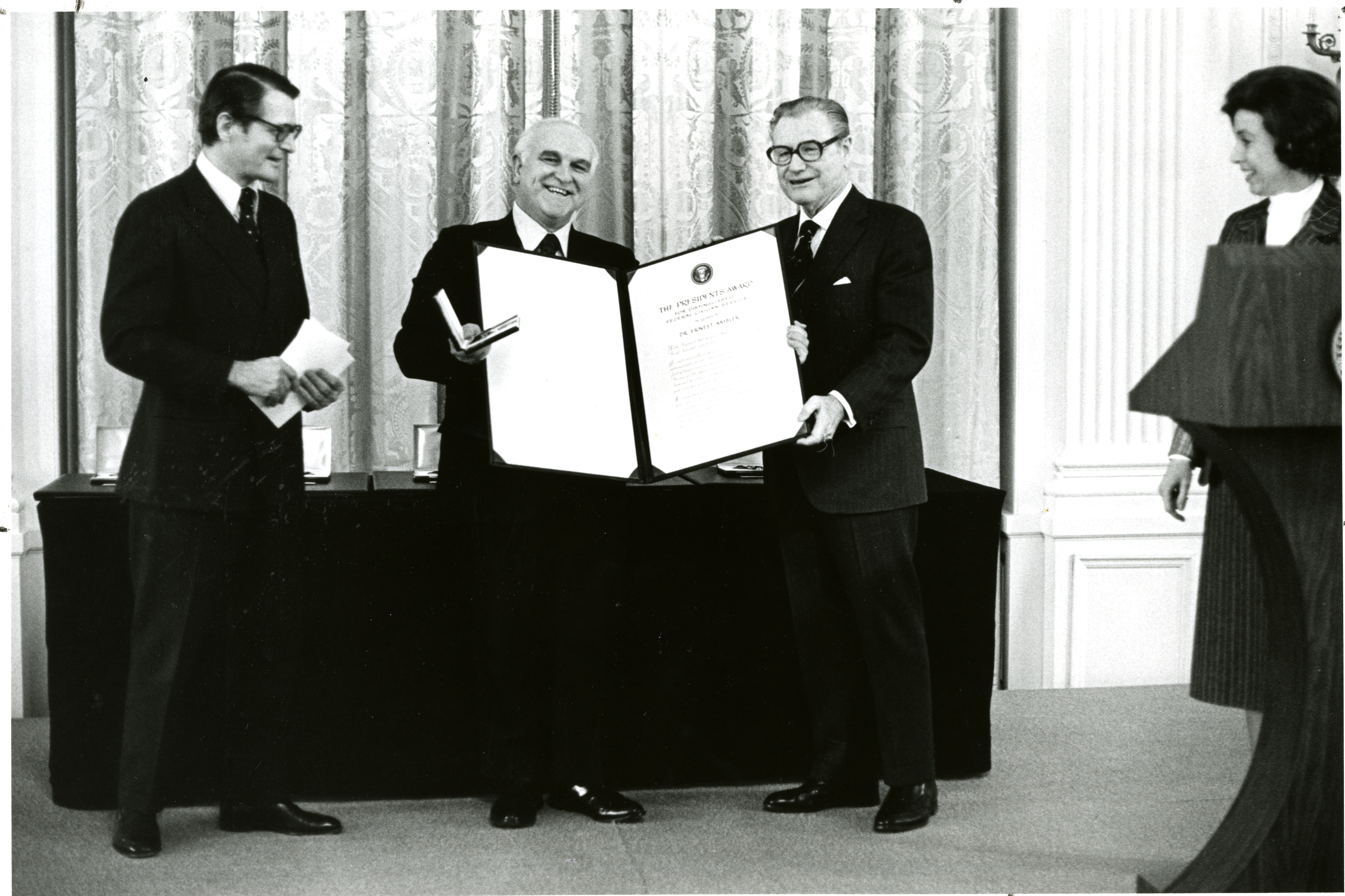
Ernest Ambler is presented with the medal and diploma of the President's Award for Distinguished Federal Civilian Service in 1977.

In 1973 Ambler was appointed deputy director of the NBS and, in 1975, served with NBS director Richard W. Roberts as the U.S. delegation to the 15th General Conference on Weights and Measures in France. Ambler assumed the position of acting director in 1975, following the departure of Roberts. In 1977 he was nominated to the office of Director of the National Bureau of Standards by President Jimmy Carter and was confirmed to the post by the U.S. Senate the following year.

Ambler presided over the 1988 change of the NBS to the National Institute of Standards and Technology and became the first director of the new agency. Though he had announced his decision to retire effective April 1989, he agreed to a request by United States Secretary of Commerce William Verity to remain as director through the end of the year and to also accept appointment, on an acting basis, to the newly created position of Under Secretary for Technology in the Department of Commerce.

== Personal life ==
Ambler was naturalized as a United States citizen in 1957. With his wife, Alice Virginia Seiler, he had two sons. He died at Hilton Head, South Carolina after a brief illness.

Government offices
Preceded by Richard W. Roberts	8th Director of the National Bureau of Standards (agency renamed NIST in 1988); 1977 – 1989	Succeeded by John W. Lyons as Director of NIST
