= Chien-Shiung Wu College =

Chien-Shiung Wu College (Chinese: 吴健雄学院) is a college named after Chien-Shiung Wu, an alumna of previous National Central University. The college is a part of Southeast University, Nanjing.

== Connection with Chen-Shiung Wu ==
The college, along with the university it belongs to, has long-lasting connections with lady Chien-Shiung Wu.

- From 1930 to 1934, Wu studied mathematics and then physics at the National Central University (Nanjing), which is the shared predecessor of tens of universities, including Nanjing University, Southeast University, and National Central University in Taiwan.
- In 1990, Wu became an honorary professor of Southeast University.
- In 2003, the name of Chien-Shiung Wu College was used, for the intensive classes started from 1985 for talented teenagers.

== President ==
- Samuel C. C. Ting (honorary president from 2004)
- The college is under the leadership of Southeast University chancellor as a college president as well.

== Subjects related ==
The college runs four tracks for its students:

- The Honorary Intensive Class in Informatics Track
- The Honorary Intensive Class in Mechanics Track
- The Ting-Bao Yang Honorary Class
- The Mathematical & Physical Intensive Class

For most of the classes, students are encouraged to decide a major subject from the beginning of third year.

== Outstanding Alumni ==
- Harry Shum
- Qiuzhen (Joe) Zou
