= Wu experiment =

1956 nuclear physics experiment on weak force parity conservation

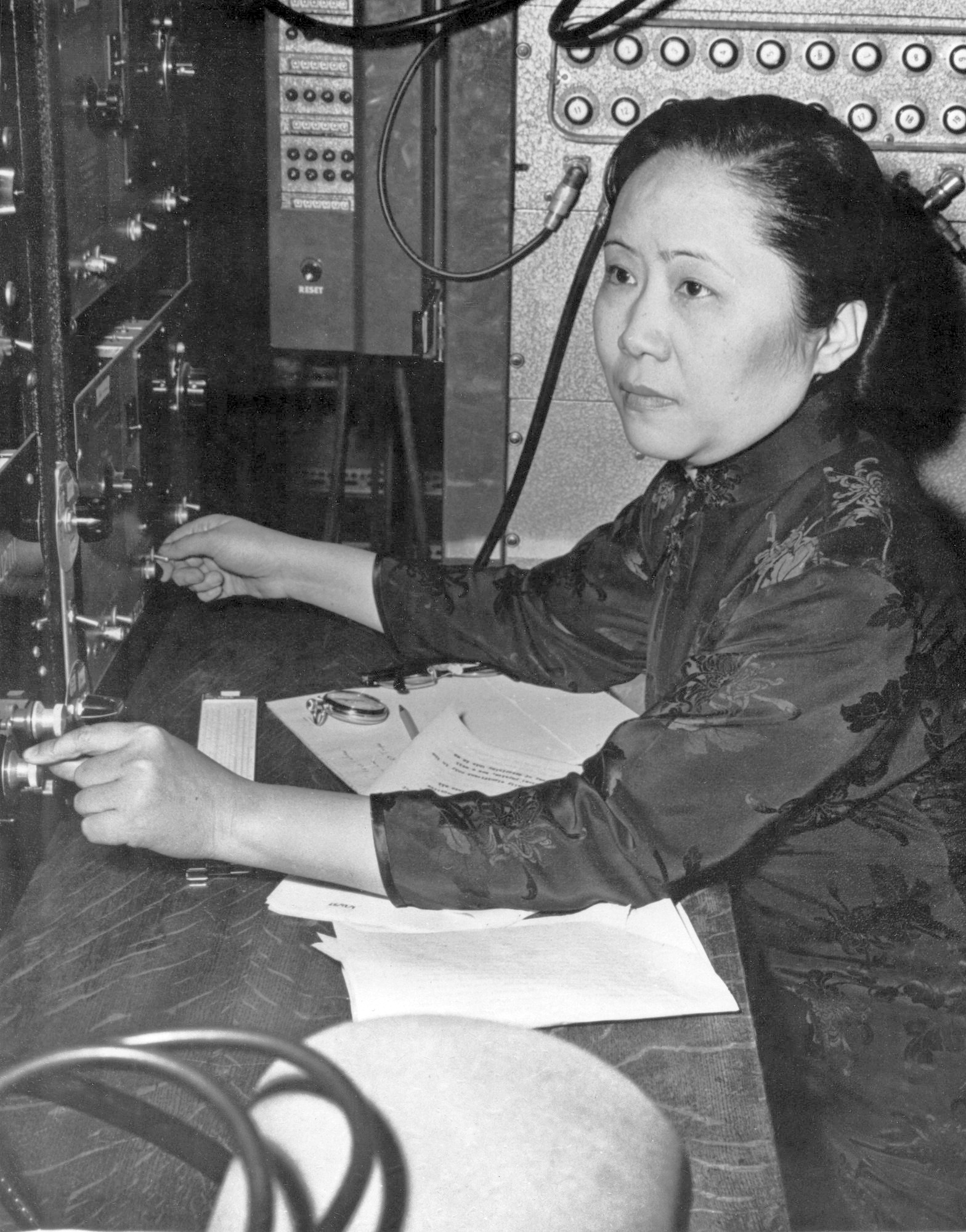
Chien-Shiung Wu, after whom the Wu experiment is named, designed the experiment and led the team that carried out the test of the conservation of parity in 1956.

The Wu experiment was a particle and nuclear physics experiment conducted in 1956 by the Chinese-American physicist Chien-Shiung Wu in collaboration with the Low Temperature Group of the US National Bureau of Standards. The experiment's purpose was to establish whether conservation of parity, which was previously established in the electromagnetic and strong interactions, also applied to weak interactions. If parity conservation were universal, particle decays governed by the weak interaction would behave similarly to particle decays involving the other interactions. A parity transformation negates the coordinates in a theory, creating a mirror image. If the predictions of the theory are not altered, it is said to "conserve parity". Objects spinning clockwise appear to spin counterclockwise in their mirror image. The Wu experiment created an atomic system with spin, then compared weak-interaction particle decay for spins clockwise and counterclockwise.

The experiment established that conservation of parity was violated by the weak interaction, thus providing a way to operationally define left and right. This result was not expected by the physics community, which had previously regarded parity as a symmetry that applied to all forces of nature. Tsung-Dao Lee and Chen-Ning Yang, the theoretical physicists who originated the idea of parity nonconservation and proposed the experiment, received the 1957 Nobel Prize in Physics for this result. While not awarded the Nobel Prize, Chien-Shiung Wu's role in the discovery was mentioned in the Nobel Prize acceptance speech of Yang and Lee, but she was not honored until 1978, when she was awarded the first Wolf Prize.

== History ==
Top: P-symmetry: A clock built like the mirrored image of the original clock will behave like the mirrored image of the original clock.
Bottom: P-asymmetry: A clock built like the mirrored image of the original clock will not behave like the mirrored image of the original clock.

The modern concept of parity was developed in 1927 when Eugene Wigner formalized the principle of the conservation of parity (P-conservation). The motivation for this theoretical principle was empirical observations by Otto Laporte for iron and Henry Norris Russell for titanium. They noted that certain transitions between atomic energy levels are not observed in experimental spectra, a concept now called a selection rule. Wigner showed that the atoms have two kinds of levels. Those of positive parity have the same functional form if the spatial coordinates are reversed (x → −x, y → −y, and z → −z). Those of negative parity change the sign of this form under this reversal of coordinates. Transitions between levels of the same parity are not observed because any emitted photon will have negative parity. The products of the parities before and after the transition have to be equal to "conserve" parity.

This principle was widely accepted by physicists because it simply reflected the intuitive idea that our world and its mirror image would behave in the same way, with the only difference being that left and right would be reversed (for example, a clock that spins clockwise would spin counterclockwise if a mirrored version of it were built). P-conservation was experimentally verified in the electromagnetic and strong interactions. However, during the late 1940s and mid-1950s, two different decays of seemingly identical kaon particles were observed. The "τ" kaon decayed into three pions, but the "θ" kaon decayed into two pions. The pion was known to have odd parity (–1): unless the relative motion of the products was unusual, decay into three pions predicted odd "τ" kaon parity [(–1)^{3} = –1], but decay into two pions predicted even "θ" kaon parity [(–1)^{2} = 1].

Decay	θ^{+}	→	π^{+}	+	π^{0}	τ^{+}	→	π^{+}	+	π^{+}	+	π^{−}
Parity	+1	=	−1	×	−1	−1	=	−1	×	−1	×	−1

As more data was accumulated on the properties of the decay products, it became clear that every property of these particles was identical except for their parity. It seemed possible that these were the same particle except for this violation of parity. This was known as the τ–θ puzzle.

Theoretical physicists Tsung-Dao Lee and Chen-Ning Yang did a literature review on the question of parity conservation in all fundamental interactions. They concluded that in the case of the weak interaction, experimental data neither confirmed nor refuted P-conservation. This information was missing for two reasons: first, the weak interaction is revealed in beta decay and the whole process must be studied for parity conservation and second, the beta decay involves a neutrino whose mass cannot be measured directly, preventing some approaches to parity checks. In the summer of 1956 Lee and Yang approached Chien-Shiung Wu, who was an expert on beta decay spectroscopy, with various ideas for experiments. They settled on the idea of testing the directional properties of beta decay in cobalt-60. Wu understood the potential for a breakthrough experiment and began work in earnest at the end of May 1956, cancelling a planned trip to Geneva and the Far East with her husband, wanting to beat the rest of the physics community to the punch. Most physicists, such as close friend Wolfgang Pauli, thought it was impossible and even expressed skepticism regarding the Yang–Lee proposal.

The key problems that needed to be solved for a successful experiment was creating and maintaining extreme cryogenic temperature while measuring beta decay from nuclei with spin. Wu had to contact Henry Boorse and Mark W. Zemansky, who had extensive experience in low-temperature physics, to perform her experiment. Boorse and Zemansky suggested that Wu contacted Ernest Ambler, of the National Bureau of Standards. Ambler arranged for the experiment to be carried out in 1956 at the NBS low-temperature laboratories. After several months of work to overcome technical difficulties, in December 1956 Wu's team observed an asymmetry that indicated parity violation.

Lee and Yang, who prompted the Wu experiment, were awarded the Nobel Prize in Physics in 1957, shortly after the experiment was performed. Wu's role in the discovery was mentioned in the prize acceptance speech. Many were outraged that she had been overlooked for the prize, from her close friend Wolfgang Pauli, to Lee and Yang, with 1988 Nobel Laureate Jack Steinberger labeling it as the biggest mistake in the Nobel committee's history. Wu did not publicly discuss her feelings about the prize, but in a letter she wrote to Steinberger, she said, "Although I did not do research just for the prize, it still hurts me a lot that my work was overlooked for certain reasons." She was not honored until 1978, when she was awarded the inaugural Wolf Prize.

== Theory ==
The aim of Wu's experiment was to determine whether parity is conserved for the weak interaction that governs beta decay. Wigner's mathematical concept of parity conservation, the equivalence of an object or process when the coordinate system is inverted, is equivalent to a mirror reflection followed by a 180° rotation in the plane of the mirror. Cobalt-60 nuclei have spin so the concept of the experiment can be imagined with a spinning ball. A ball spinning in a right-hand rule direction would have a mirror image with a left-hand spin, but this mirror image ball would look identical to an upside down ball spinning according to the right hand rule: after the 180° rotation there would be no physical differences. However, if the spinning ball had a mark on top or bottom, the reflection would no longer look the same. If the emitted electron from decay products of cobalt-60 were being emitted preferentially either along or against the cobalt spin axis direction, this would create a difference analogous to the mark. A difference in emission probability would signify a violation of parity symmetry. As stated by Wu et al.:

If an asymmetry in the distribution between θ and 180° − θ (where θ is the angle between the orientation of the parent nuclei and the momentum of the electrons) is observed, it provides unequivocal proof that parity is not conserved in beta decay.

Parity transformation concept of the Wu experiment in terms of rotation direction (also represented by the axial vector j) and a polar vector e. A three-axis parity transformation is illustrated here, resulting in e being reversed rather than being a mirror image.

The idea can also be described using the properties of vectors. The cobalt-60 nucleus has spin, and spin angular momentum does not change direction under parity. A vector with this property is called an axial vector. Conversely, the direction in which the decay products are emitted is changed under parity and their linear momentum vector is called polar vector. In other words, if in one view the cobalt-60 nuclear spin and the decay product emissions were both in roughly the same direction, then in a mirror image world, they would be in roughly opposite directions, because the emission direction would have been flipped, but the spin direction would not.

Conceptually the experiment is "relatively simple": orient ^{60}Co by means of a magnetic field and measure the amount of beta emission directed along or against the direction of the magnetic field. Among the numerous challenges were maintaining and monitoring the orientation, avoiding systematic bias in the orientation, and detecting the electrons emitted in each direction. Measures to address these challenges are often difficult to apply simultaneously in practice. For example, maintaining the nuclear spin orientation requires a temperature below that achievable by liquid helium evaporation, which makes simultaneous detection in opposite directions difficult, and use of the magnetocaloric effect for cooling requires removal of a magnetic field, while alignment of the nuclei requires application of a magnetic field.

== Experiment ==
Decay scheme of ^{60}Co; both gamma rays arise from electric quadrupole transitions.

The experiment monitored the decay of cobalt-60 (^{60}Co) atoms that were aligned by a uniform magnetic field (the polarizing field) and cooled to near absolute zero so that thermal motions did not randomize the alignment. Cobalt-60 is an unstable isotope of cobalt that decays by beta decay to an excited state of the isotope nickel-60 (^{60}Ni). During this decay, one of the neutrons in the cobalt-60 nucleus decays to a proton by emitting an electron (e^{−}) and an electron antineutrino (ν̅_{e}). The resulting excited nickel nucleus promptly decays to its ground state by emitting two gamma rays (γ) in quick succession. Hence the overall nuclear equation of the reaction is:

$${}^{60}_{27}\text{Co} \rightarrow {}^{60}_{28}\text{Ni} + \text{e}^{-} + \bar{\nu}_e + 2{\gamma}$$

Using a magnetic field to orient the cobalt-60 nuclei in one direction and using a reversed field to orient the nuclei in the opposite direction places the detectors in opposite hemispheres with respect to the nuclear spin. If the pattern of electron emission (beta rays) differs in these two conditions, parity is not conserved.

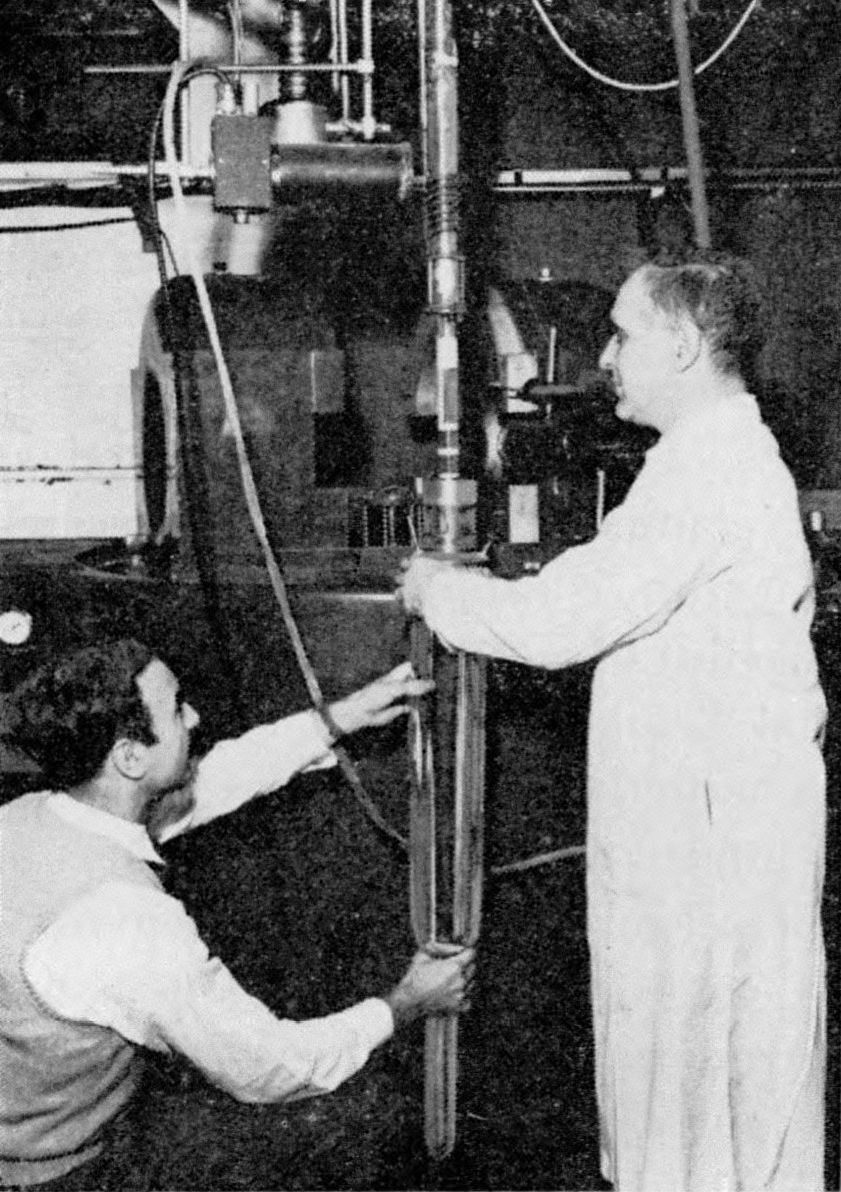
The Wu experiment performed at the Bureau of Standards low temperature laboratory, Washington DC, in 1956. The vertical vacuum chamber, containing the cobalt-60, detectors, and field coil, is being placed into a Dewar before being inserted into the large electromagnet in the background, which will cool the radioisotope near absolute zero by adiabatic demagnetization.

The gamma rays also play a crucial role in the experiment. Gamma rays are photons, and their release from the nickel-60 nucleus is an electromagnetic process. This is significant because electromagnetism was known to respect parity conservation, and therefore the gamma-ray emission pattern should be independent of changes in parity. The gamma rays are emitted in a distribution peaked around the two directions of the cobalt-60 nuclear spin axis: the degree to which the gamma rays were not distributed perfectly equally in all directions (the "anisotropy" of their distribution) can be used to determine how well the cobalt-60 nuclear spins had been aligned. Spin alignment is necessary to observe the anisotropy in the electron emission. If the cobalt-60 nuclei were randomly oriented, the experiment would detect equal numbers of electrons emitted in every direction.

The experiment then counted the rate of emission of electrons along the magnetic field, and of gamma rays along the magnetic field and perpendicularly to it. These rates were then compared with the polarizing field oriented in the opposite direction. If the electron counting rates differed significantly for the two field orientations, there would be strong evidence that the weak interaction does violate parity conservation.

In addition, the experiment was monitored over time as the apparatus slowly warmed up. The gamma ray anisotropy, measured in the direction of the magnetic field (polar direction) and perpendicular to this (equatorial direction) slowly vanished, indicating loss of spin polarization with increasing temperature. The observed asymmetry of the electron counts in the two directions of the polarizing field should track the gamma ray anisotropy results.

=== Materials and methods ===
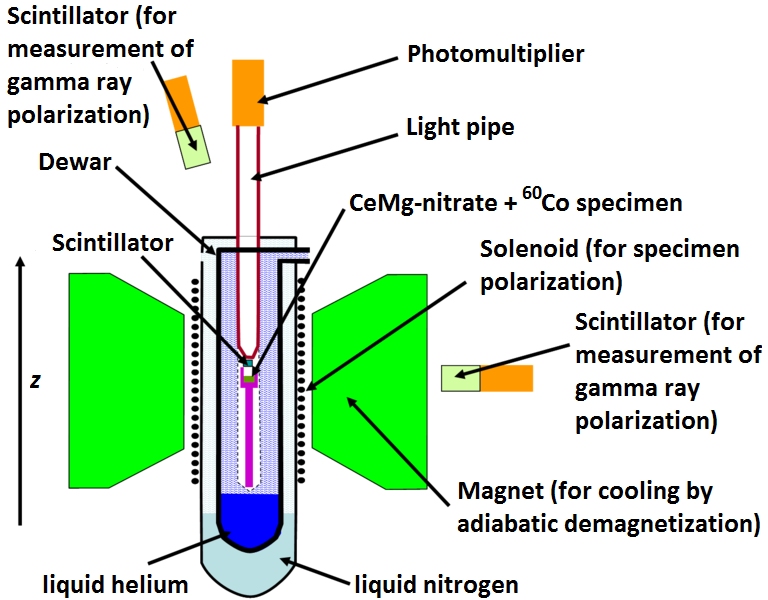
Schematic of the Wu experiment

The experimental challenge in this experiment was to obtain a high directional orientation or polarization of the ^{60}Co nuclei. For normal materials in spin state I the fraction of polarization is proportional to the magnet moment of the nuclei, $\mu$, the applied field, H and inversely proportional to temperature:
$$f_N = \frac{1}{3}\frac{I+1}{I}\frac{\mu H}{kT}.$$

Due to the very small magnetic moments of the nuclei, a magnetic field of about 1 T (10000 G) is required at extremely low temperatures (around 0.01 K), a combination that is very difficult to achieve.

In a paramagnetic element the unpaired 3d or 4f electrons create a strong magnetic field, about 0.1 T (1000 G), at the nucleus. In that case, the fractional polarization becomes proportional to the fractional polarization of the electrons but is otherwise independent of the applied field. Thus for nuclei with magnetic moments in a paramagnetic material, aligning the electrons with a strong magnetic field has the side effect of aligning the nuclei. The concept can be paired with adiabatic demagnetization, in which a paramagnetic salt is placed in an external magnetic field and heat caused by the alignment of the electrons is extracted by pumping the liquid helium to low pressure, giving a temperature 1.2 K. When the external field is removed, randomization of the electron spins cools the salt. A temperature of 0.01 K can be achieved by this process. Thus internal paramagnetism is manipulated to both cool the sample and provide the field to align the nuclei. This concept became known as the Rose–Gorter method.

As was demonstrated by the NBS team in 1953, high nuclear polarization can be obtained even at low fields by using an anisotropic paramagnetic crystal like cerium magnesium nitrate, a paramagnetic salt still favored for magnetic refrigeration. Aligning the magnetically sensitive axis of the crystal horizontally allows a horizontal magnetic field to provide adiabatic cooling, while minimizing any reheating due to a vertical field used during the measurement phase of the experiment.

The Wu team deposited radioactive cobalt as a 0.05 mm (0.002 in) layer on the surface of the cerium magnesium nitrate crystal, providing thermal bonding to allow the cooling of the crystal to cool the outer cobalt layer. The central bore of the horizontal refrigeration magnet was opened up to allow room for a vertical solenoid to be introduced. It would align the spin axis of the cobalt nuclei vertically, with a direction of spin that is determined by the direction of the field.

A thin anthracene crystal acting as a scintillator was placed just above the cobalt-coated CeMg-nitrate crystal. Beta electrons exiting the cobalt layer and striking the anthracene produce a tiny light pulse, which was transmitted to a photomultiplier on the top of the apparatus via a lucite light pipe.

The production of gamma-rays was monitored using equatorial and polar scintillators and photomultipliers. The difference in counting rate between these location measures gamma-ray anisotropy. This anisotropy was continuously monitored over the next quarter-hour as the crystal warmed up and the anisotropy decreased. Likewise, beta-ray emissions were continuously monitored during this warming period. Then the entire process was repeated with the solenoid field reversed, creating the equivalent of a mirror image inversion.

=== Results ===
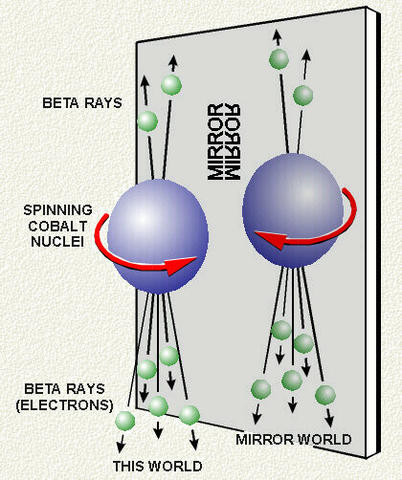
Co nuclei emit more beta rays in direction opposite to the right hand rule. The mirror images here are not related by inversion symmetry, contrary to parity conservation.

The Wu paper reported a "large" beta-emission asymmetry between the two directions of nuclear spin polarization. This was sufficient to show that parity was not conserved, which was the key result of the paper. Specifically they found that "the emission of beta particles is more favored in the direction opposite to that of the nuclear spin".

A quantitative value is more helpful for theoretical comparisons. As shown by Yang and Lee in the appendix to their theory paper, the weak interaction Hamiltonian without parity conservation predicts an interference between parity-conserving and parity-non-conserving terms. The emitted electron angular distribution as a function of the angle θ between the nuclear spin and the electron momentum vector would follow
$$W(\theta) = 1 + A P \frac{v}{c}\cos\theta$$
defines an asymmetry parameter A. Here the polarization, P of the nuclear spin, I, is defined as
$$P = \frac{\langle I_z\rangle}{I}$$
and v/c is the ratio of the emitted electron speed to the speed of light. The experiment only measured the angular distribution in two opposite directions along the magnetic field direction and observed a value of −0.25 for the subexpression in the expression above for the distribution:
$$A P \frac{v}{c} = \frac{W(0) - W(\pi)}{W(0) + W(\pi)} = -0.25$$
The measurements gave v/c = 0.6 and, from the gamma ray anisotropy, the polarization was 0.65. With these values and a correction for backscattering of electrons from the bulk crystal, the asymmetry comes out to −1. The paper would only claim a "lower limit" to the beta asymmetry of −0.7. This value was obtained by comparing the observed electron measurements to the gamma-ray measurements as well as other adjustments. Among the systematic checks, the observed electron asymmetry did not change sign when the horizontal field used for magnetic cooling was reversed, meaning that the asymmetry was not being caused by remanent magnetization in the samples. Wu and her team had observed that the electrons were emitted in a direction preferentially opposite to that of the nuclear spin. Later refinements of the experiment established an asymmetry value was −1.01±0.02.

== Mechanism and consequences ==
The results greatly surprised the physics community. Confirming experiments were launched and published within months. Some theorists reacted with disbelief at the results. Wolfgang Pauli upon being informed by Georges M. Temmer, who also worked at the NBS, that parity conservation could no longer be assumed to be true in all cases, exclaimed "That's total nonsense!" Temmer assured him that the experiment's result confirmed this was the case, to which Pauli curtly replied "Then it must be repeated!" By the end of 1957, further research confirmed the original results of Wu's group, and P-violation was firmly established.

The discovery that parity is not conserved in nuclear beta-decay means the electron emitted in the decay has maximum longitudinal polarization of −v/c: the spin vector of the electron is primarily opposite to its momentum vector and together these define a left-handed coordinate system. This consequence was predicted by Lee and Yang directly after Wu's result and verified by direct measurements in 1957.

The Wu experiment directly impacted the theory of the neutrino. In 1929, Weyl proposed a particle/antiparticle pair with opposite spin, one right handed and one left handed. The idea was dismissed because it violated parity. With the Wu result in hand, this two-component theory could be revived. At a Christmas party in 1956 before the Wu team paper was published, Leon M. Lederman learned about the results. He teamed up with Richard Garwin and Marcel Weinrich to test parity in two decay reactions involving weak interaction and neutrinos:
$$\pi^+ \rightarrow \mu^+ + \nu,$$
and
$$\mu^+ \rightarrow  e^+ + 2\nu.$$
They completed their experiment shortly after New Year day 1957. This, together with the Wu experiment, solidified the case for the two-component neutrino theory. The assignment of which handedness or helicity went with which of the two particles was settled by the Goldhaber experiment later in 1957: neutrinos are left-handed. (The standard two-component model requires massless neutrinos. Recent observations that neutrinos may have mass has opened the possibility that right-handed neutrinos might exist.)

The discovery of parity violation meant the number of parameters in theories of the weak interaction suddenly doubled from five to ten terms: pairs of terms that were expected to be identical became independent. The possibility that these pairs of terms would lead to interference effects had to be studied. With the seemingly rock-solid parity invariance upended, time-invariance and conservation of lepton number were reexamined. Observations of beta decay prior to 1956 also had to be reanalyzed to look for cases where assumption of parity conservation distorted the conclusions.

== Impact and influence ==
The results from the Wu experiment set off a number of confirming and complementary experiments checks as well as changes in theoretical treatments. The discovery has been described as the parity revolution and set the stage for the development of the Standard Model, as the model relied on the idea of symmetry of particles and forces and how particles can sometimes break that symmetry. The wide coverage of her discovery prompted the discoverer of fission Otto Robert Frisch to mention that people at Princeton would often say that her discovery was the most significant since the Michelson–Morley experiment that inspired Einstein's theory of relativity. The AAUW called it the "solution to the number-one riddle of atomic and nuclear physics". Beyond showing the distinct characteristic of weak interaction compared to the other three interactions, this eventually led to general theory of CP violation, the violation of the charge conjugation parity symmetry. In recognition of their theoretical work, Lee and Yang were awarded the Nobel Prize for Physics in 1957.

The results of the Wu experiment provide a way to operationally define the notion of left and right. This is inherent in the nature of the weak interaction. The Wu experiment solved the Ozma problem, which is to give an unambiguous definition of left and right scientifically. One version of this problem imagines trying to communicate the concept of left and right. Previously, if the scientists on Earth were to communicate with a newly discovered planet's scientist, and they had never met in person, it would not have been possible for each group to determine unambiguously the other group's left and right. With the Wu experiment, it is possible to communicate to the other group what the words left and right mean exactly and unambiguously.

== See also ==
- The Ambidextrous Universe by Martin Gardner; book containing a lengthy popular discussion of parity and the Wu experiment
- Fermi's interaction
