= Chien-Shiung Wu =

Chinese-American physicist (1912–1997)

- 吳健雄
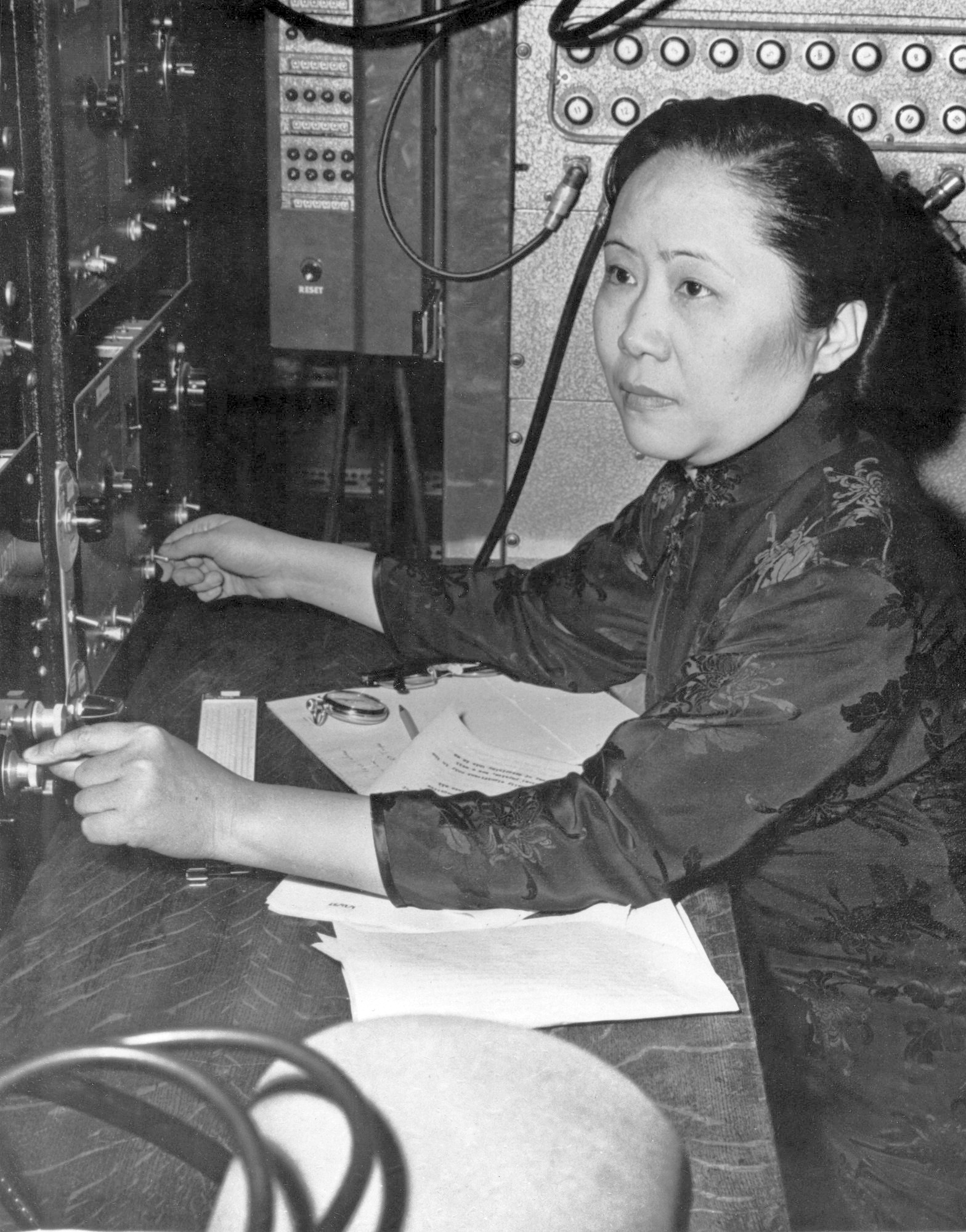
- Chien-Shiung Wu performing experiments, c. 1963
- Born: May 31, 1912; Liuhe, Taicang, Jiangsu, Republic of China
- Died: February 16, 1997 (aged 84); New York City, U.S.
- Citizenship: Republic of China; United States
- Education: National Central University (BS); University of California, Berkeley (PhD)
- Known for: Manhattan Project; Nuclear fission; Wu experiment; Parity violation; Beta decay; Quantum entanglement
- Spouse: Luke Chia-Liu Yuan (m. 1942)
- Children: Vincent Yuan (袁緯承)
- Awards: Comstock Prize in Physics (1964); Bonner Prize (1975); National Medal of Science (1975); Wolf Prize in Physics (1978)
- Scientific career
- Fields: Physics
- Workplaces: Institute of Physics, Academia Sinica; University of California, Berkeley; Smith College; Princeton University; Columbia University; Zhejiang University
- Thesis: I. The Continuous X-Rays Excited by the Beta-Particles of ^{32}P. II. Radioactive Xenons (1940)
- Doctoral advisor: Ernest Lawrence

Chinese name
- Traditional Chinese: 吳健雄
- Simplified Chinese: 吴健雄
Transcriptions
Standard Mandarin
- Hanyu Pinyin: Wú Jiànxióng
- Wade–Giles: Wu^{2} Chien^{4}-Shiung^{2}
- IPA: [ǔ tɕjɛ̂n.ɕjʊ̌ŋ]

Chien-Shiung Wu (Chinese: 吳健雄; pinyin: Wú Jiànxióng; May 31, 1912 – February 16, 1997) was a Chinese-American particle and experimental physicist who made significant contributions in the fields of nuclear and particle physics. Wu worked on the Manhattan Project, where she helped develop the process for separating uranium into uranium-235 and uranium-238 isotopes by gaseous diffusion. She is best known for conducting the Wu experiment, which proved that parity is not conserved. This discovery resulted in her colleagues Tsung-Dao Lee and Chen-Ning Yang winning the 1957 Nobel Prize in Physics, while Wu herself was awarded the inaugural Wolf Prize in Physics in 1978. Her expertise in experimental physics evoked comparisons to Marie Curie. Her nicknames include the "First Lady of Physics", the "Chinese Marie Curie" and the "Queen of Nuclear Research".

== Early life ==
Chien-Shiung Wu was born in the town of Liuhe, Taicang, in Jiangsu province, China, on May 31, 1912. She was the second of three children of Wu Zhong-Yi (吳仲裔) and Fan Fu-Hua (樊復華). The family custom was that children of this generation had Chien as the first character (generation name) of their forename, followed by the characters in the phrase Ying-Shiung-Hao-Jie (英雄豪傑), which means "heroes and outstanding figures". Accordingly, she had an older brother, Chien-Ying (健英, and a younger brother, Chien-Hao (健豪).

Wu's father, Zhong-Yi, encouraged her interests in science, creating an environment where she was surrounded by books, magazines, and newspapers. Wu's mother was a teacher who valued education for both sexes. Zhong-Yi was an engineer and a social progressive. He participated in the 1913 Second Revolution while in Shanghai and moved to Liuhe after its failure. He then became a local leader who headed a militia that hunted local bandits. He also established the Ming De School for girls with himself as principal.

== Education ==
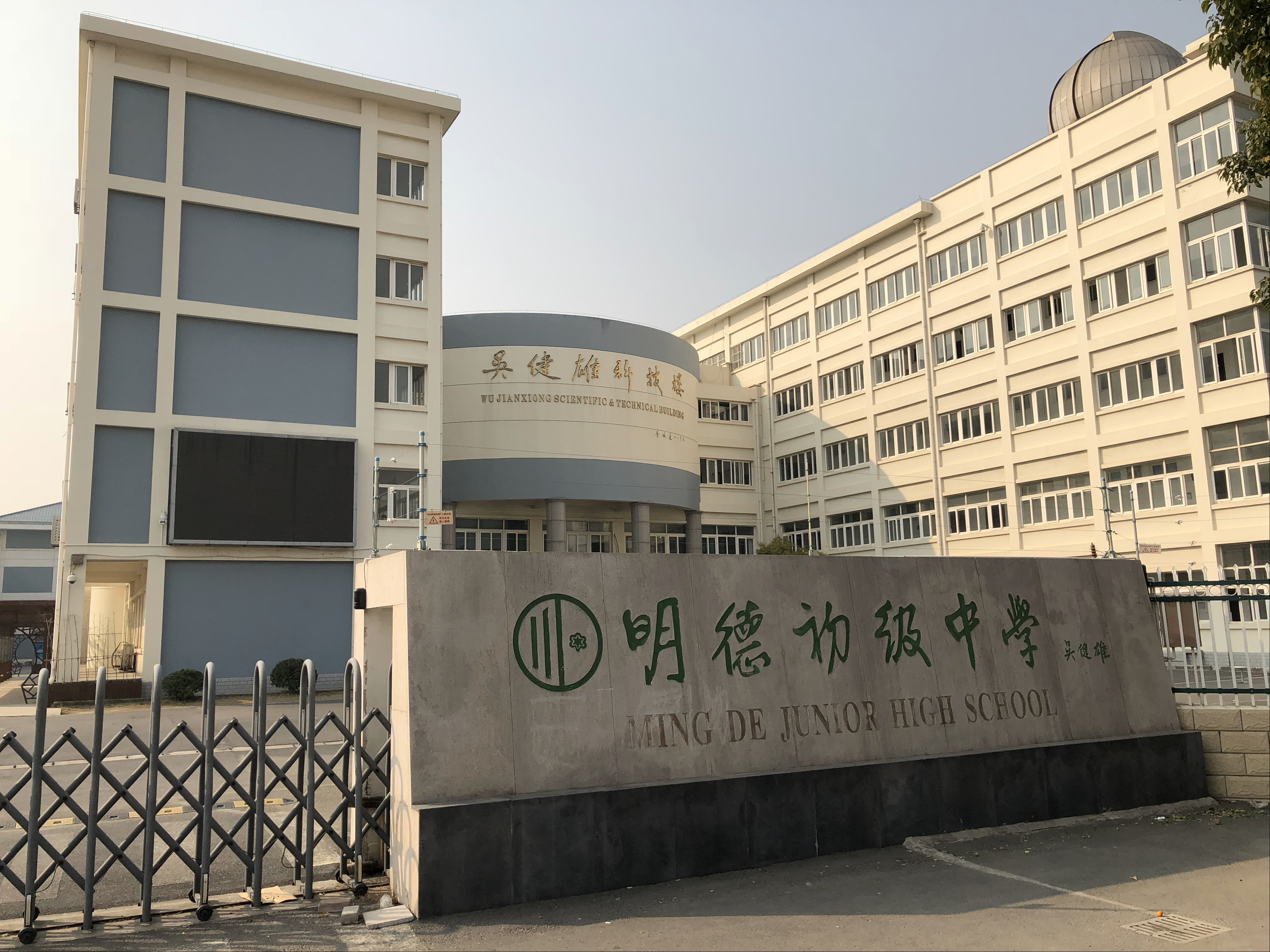
Wu studied at Mingde Middle School. The backmost building is named for her.

Wu received primary education at the Ming De School. Wu grew up as a modest and inquisitive child in a well-to-do family. She did not play outside like the other children but instead would listen to the newly invented radio for pleasure and knowledge. She also enjoyed poetry and Chinese classics such as the Analects, and western literature on democracy that her father promoted at home. Wu would listen to her father recite paragraphs from scientific journals instead of children's stories until Wu learned how to read.

Wu left her hometown in 1923 at the age of 11 to go to the Suzhou Women's Normal School No. 2, which was 50 miles (80 km) from her home. This was a boarding school with classes for teacher training as well as for regular high school, and it introduced subjects in science that slowly became a growing passion for the young Wu. Admission to teacher training was more competitive, as it did not charge for tuition or board and guaranteed a job on graduation. Although her family could have afforded to pay, Wu chose the more competitive option and was ranked ninth among around 10,000 applicants.

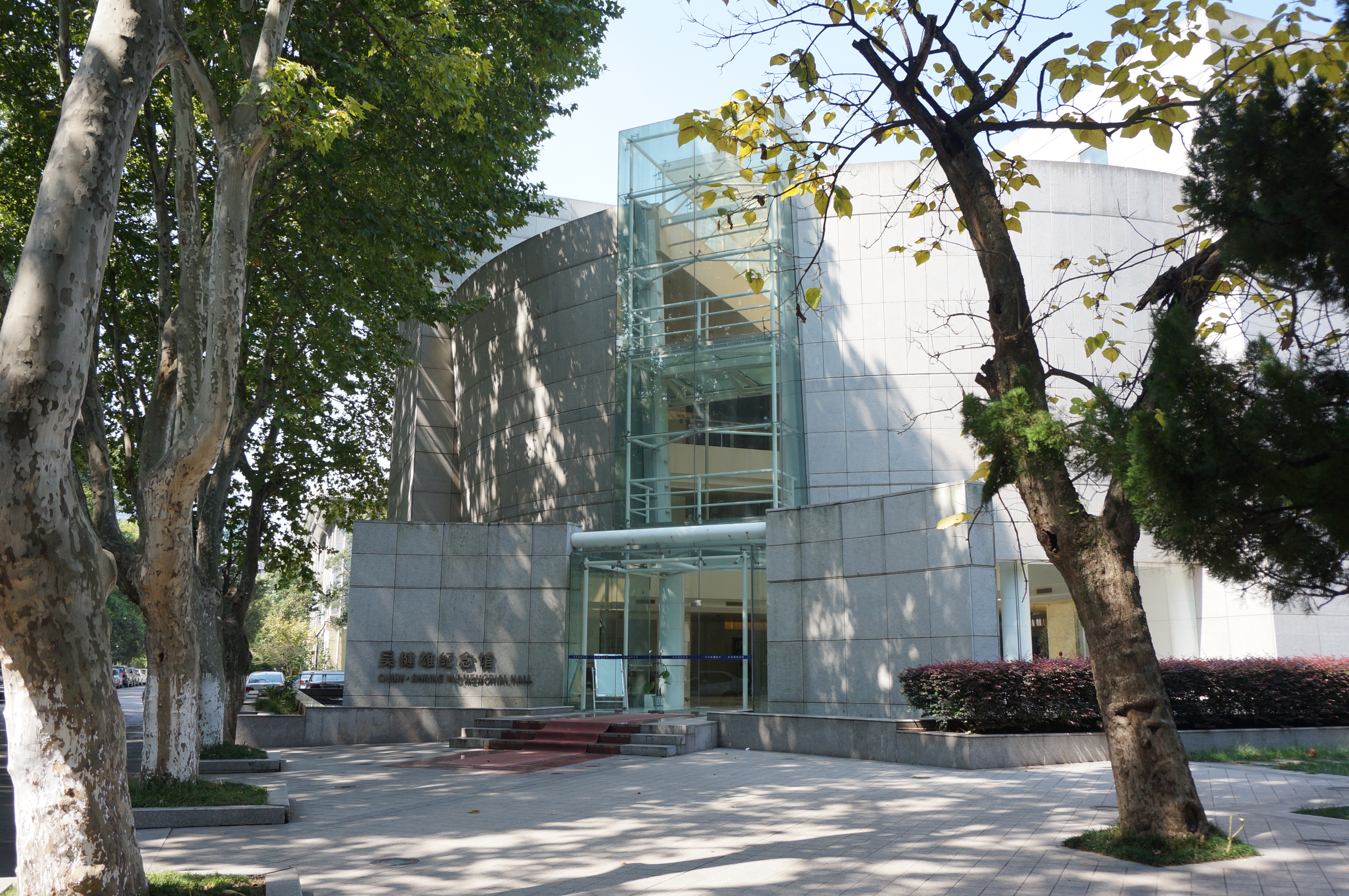
Chien-Shiung Wu Memorial Museum, Southeast University.

In 1929, Wu graduated at the top of her class and was admitted to National Central University in Nanjing. According to government regulations of the time, teacher-training college students wanting to move on to universities needed to serve as schoolteachers for one year. In Wu's case, this was only nominally enforced. She went to teach at a public school in Shanghai, the president of which was the famous philosopher Hu Shih. Hu became a very notable political icon whom Wu saw as a second father and would visit Wu when she was in the United States. Hu was previously Wu's teacher when she took a few courses at National China College and was impressed when Wu, who sat in the front seat to be noticed by her hero, finished and perfected the first three-hour assessment in less than two hours.

From 1930 to 1934, Wu studied at National Central University, where she initially majored in mathematics but later transferred to physics. She became involved in student politics. Relations between China and Japan were tense at this time, and students were urging the government to take a stronger line with Japan. Wu was elected as one of the student leaders by her colleagues because they felt that since she was one of the top students at the university, her involvement would be forgiven, or at least overlooked, by the authorities. That being the case, she was careful not to neglect her studies. She led protests that included a sit-in at the Presidential Palace in Nanjing, where the students were met by Chiang Kai-shek.

For two years after graduation, she did graduate-level study in physics and worked as an assistant at Zhejiang University. She became a researcher at the Institute of Physics of the Academia Sinica. Her research on low-temperature gas spectroscopy was supervised by Ku Zing-whai, the only female physics professor at the institute and the first female physics PhD in the country. Ku had earned her doctoral degree at the University of Michigan and encouraged Wu to do the same. She became an important role model to the young Wu, who developed confidence and was sometimes blunt and honest when giving advice to close friends. Wu was accepted by the University of Michigan, and her uncle, Wu Zhou-Zhi, provided the necessary funds. She embarked for the United States with a female friend and chemist from Taicang, Dong Ruo-Fen (董若芬), on the SS President Hoover in August 1936. Her parents and uncle saw her off at the Huangpu Bund as she boarded the ship. Though her family would survive the Second World War, she would only visit the remaining members of her family decades later when she made trips to China in the 1970s.

== Early physics career ==
=== Berkeley ===
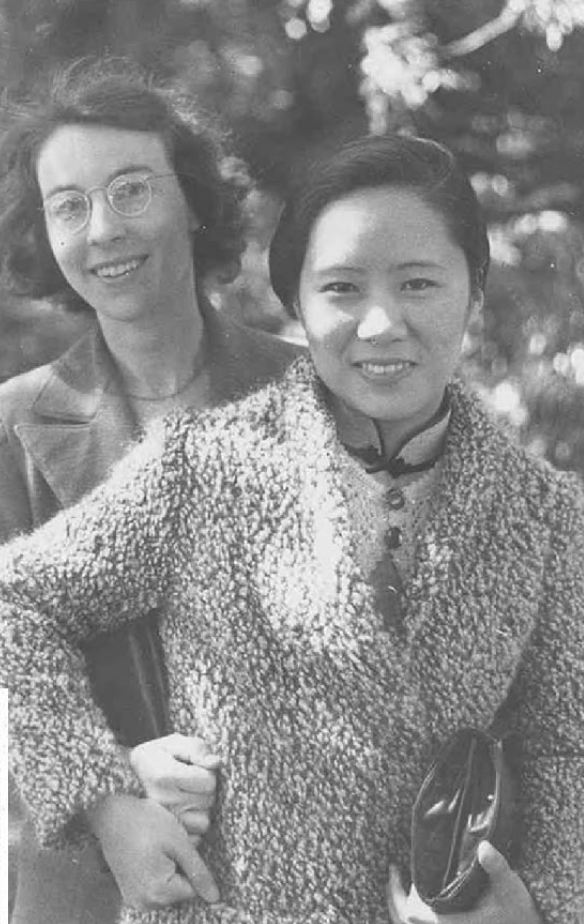
Wu (right) in an outing with Margaret Lewis in Berkeley, California

Wu and Dong Ruo-Fen arrived in San Francisco, where Wu's plans for graduate study changed after visiting the University of California, Berkeley. She met physicist Luke Chia-Liu Yuan, a middle-class grandson from the concubine of Yuan Shikai (the self-proclaimed president of the new Republic of China and Emperor of China for six months before his death). As a result of his political lineage, Luke did not talk much about Yuan Shikai and Wu would tease him after she discovered the truth since her father once rebelled against Yuan Shikai. Yuan showed her the Radiation Laboratory, where the director was Ernest O. Lawrence, who would soon win the Nobel Prize for Physics in 1939 for his invention of the cyclotron particle accelerator.

Wu was shocked at the sexism in American society when she learned that at Michigan women were not even allowed to use the front entrance, and decided that she would prefer to study at the more liberal Berkeley in California. Wu was also influenced by her interest in the Berkeley facilities which included the first cyclotron of Lawrence, but her decision would disappoint Dong who studied at Michigan on her own. Yuan took her to see Raymond T. Birge, the head of the physics department, and he offered Wu a place in the graduate school despite the fact that the academic year had already commenced. Wu abandoned her plans to study at Michigan and enrolled at Berkeley. Her Berkeley classmates included Robert R. Wilson, who like others secretly admired Wu, and George Volkoff; her closest friends included post-doctoral student Margaret Lewis and Ursula Schaefer, a history student who chose to remain in the United States rather than return to Nazi Germany.

Wu missed Chinese cuisine and was not impressed with the food at Berkeley, so she always dined with friends such as Schaeffer at her favorite restaurant, the Tea Garden. Wu and her friends would get free meals that were not part of the menu due to her friendship with the owner. Wu applied for a scholarship at the end of her first year, but there was prejudice against Asian students from the department head Birge, and Wu and Yuan were instead offered a readership with a lower stipend. Yuan then applied for, and secured, a scholarship at Caltech. Birge, however, respected Wu for her talents and was the reason Wu could enroll even though the academic year already started.

Wu made rapid progress in her education and her research. Although Lawrence was officially her supervisor, she also worked closely with the famous Italian physicist Emilio Segrè. She quickly became his favorite student and the two conducted studies on beta decay, including xenon, which would provide important results in the future of nuclear bombs. According to Segrè, Wu was a popular student who was talented. In his autobiography, Nobel laureate Luis Alvarez said of Wu,

I got to know this graduate student in this idle time. She used the same room next door, and was called "Gee Gee" [Wu's nickname at Berkeley]. She was the most talented and most beautiful experimental physicist I have ever met.

Segrè recognized Wu's brilliance and compared her to Wu's heroine Marie Curie, whom Wu always quoted, but said that Wu was more "worldly, elegant, and witty." Meanwhile, Lawrence described Wu as "the most talented female experimental physicist he had ever known, and that she would make any laboratory shine." When it came time to present her thesis in 1940, it had two separate parts presented in very neat fashion. The first was on bremsstrahlung, the electromagnetic radiation produced by the deceleration of a charged particle when deflected by another charged particle, typically an electron by an atomic nucleus, with the latter being on radioactive Xe. She investigated the first study using beta-emitting phosphorus-32, a radioactive isotope easily produced in the cyclotron that Lawrence and his brother John H. Lawrence were evaluating for use in cancer treatment and as a radioactive tracer. This marked Wu's first work with beta decay, a subject on which she would become an authority.

The second part of the thesis was about the production of radioactive isotopes of Xe produced by the nuclear fission of uranium with the 37-inch and 60-inch cyclotrons at the Radiation Laboratory. Her second part on Xe and nuclear fission so impressed her committee, which featured Lawrence and J. Robert Oppenheimer, whom Wu affectionately called, "Oppie", that Oppenheimer believed that Wu knew everything about the absorption cross section of neutrons, a concept that would be applied when Wu joined the Manhattan Project.

Wu completed her PhD in June 1940, and was elected to Phi Beta Kappa, the US academic honor society. In spite of Lawrence and Segrè's recommendations, she could not secure a faculty position at a university, so she remained at the Radiation Laboratory as a post-doctoral fellow. Her plans changed when the Second World War began.

=== World War II and the Manhattan Project ===
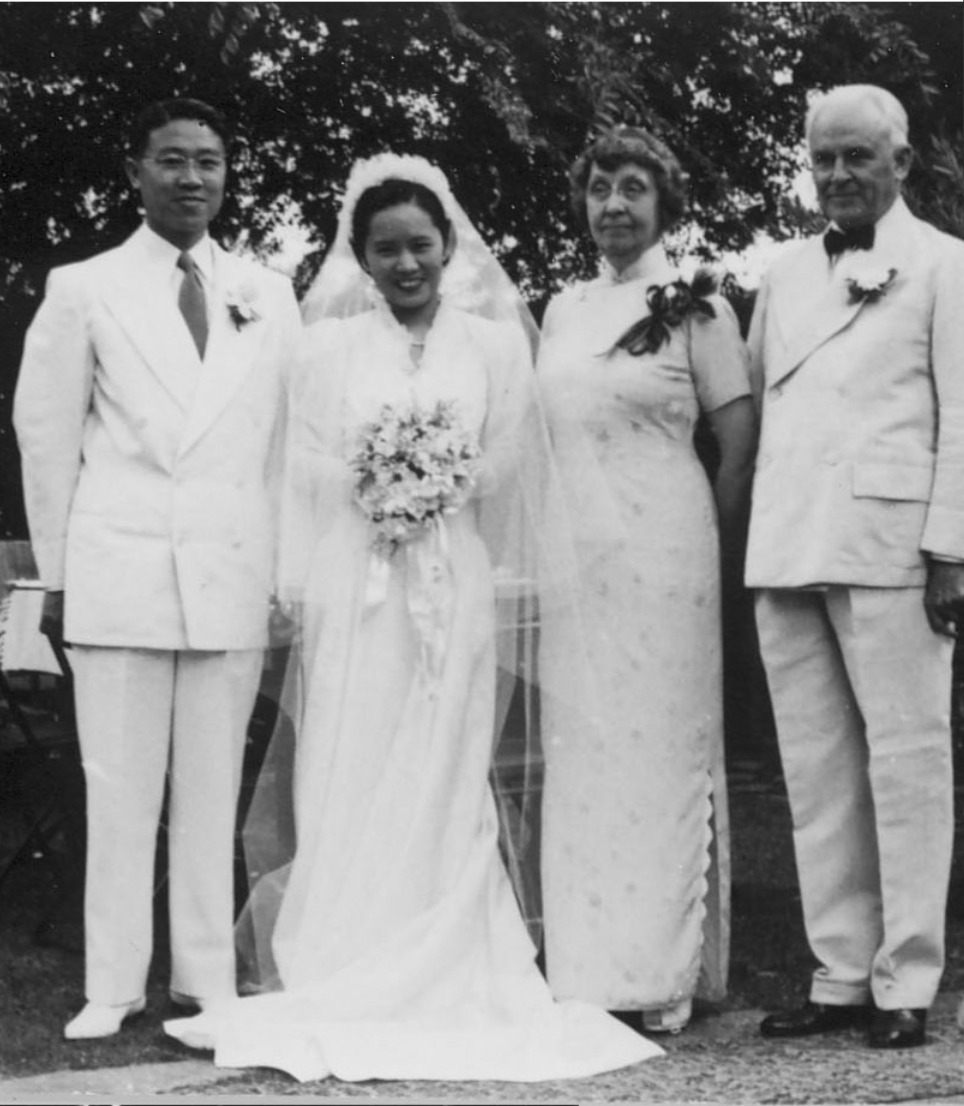
Luke Yuan (left) and Chien-Shiung Wu at the home of Greta and Robert Millikan (right) on their wedding day

Wu and Yuan were married at the home of Robert Millikan, Yuan's academic supervisor and the President of Caltech, on May 30, 1942. Neither the bride's nor the groom's families were able to attend due to the outbreak of the Pacific War. Wu and Yuan moved to the East Coast of the United States, where Wu became an assistant professor at Smith College, a private women's college in Northampton, Massachusetts, while Yuan worked on radar for RCA. She found the job frustrating, as her duties involved teaching only, and there was no opportunity for research. She appealed to Lawrence, who wrote letters of recommendation to a number of universities. Smith responded by making Wu an associate professor and increasing her salary. She accepted a job from Princeton University in New Jersey as the first female faculty member in the history of the physics department, where she taught officers of the navy.

In March 1944, Wu joined the Manhattan Project's Substitute Alloy Materials (SAM) Laboratories at Columbia University. She lived in a dormitory there, returning to Princeton on the weekends. The role of the SAM Laboratories, headed by Harold Urey, was to support the Manhattan Project's gaseous diffusion (K-25) program for uranium enrichment. Wu worked alongside James Rainwater in a group led by William W. Havens Jr., whose task was to develop radiation detector instrumentation.

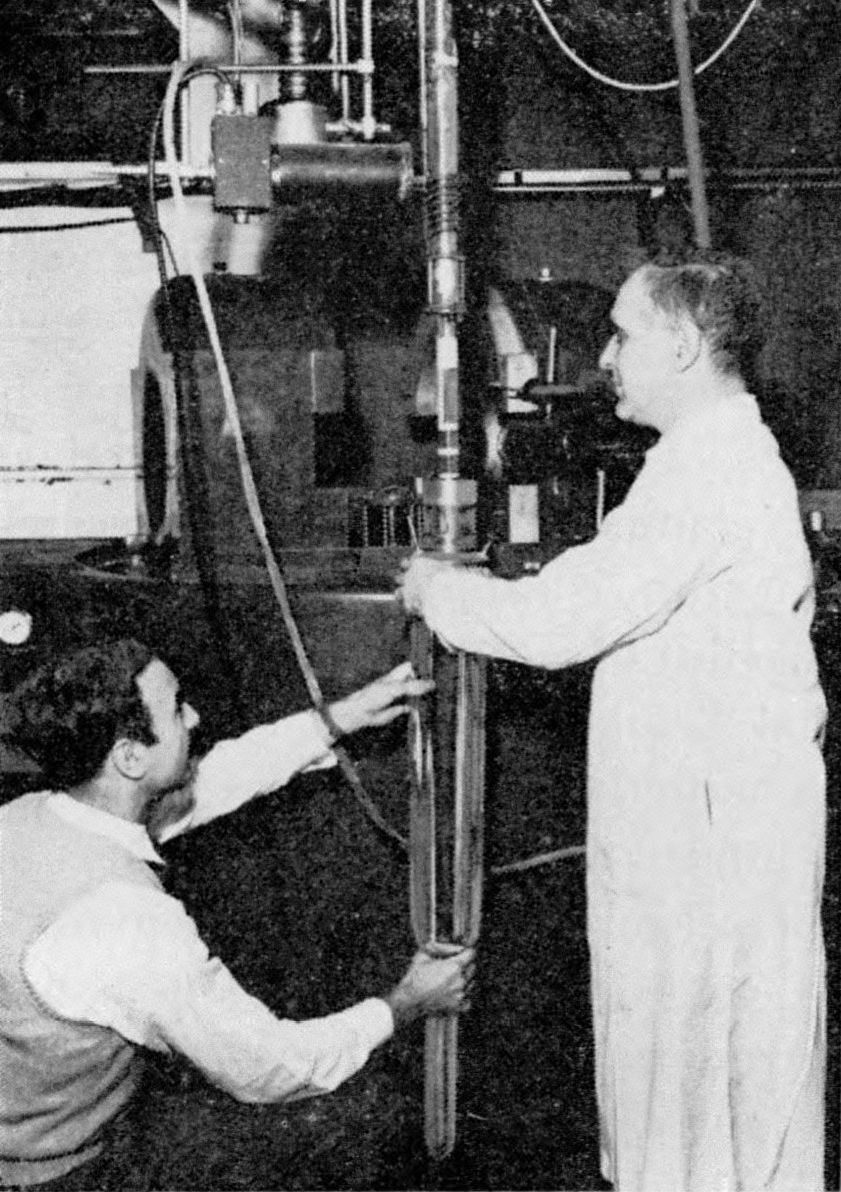
Chien-Shiung Wu's experimental results were a huge influence to other physicists and were duplicated by many scientists

In September 1944, Wu was contacted by the Manhattan District Engineer, Colonel Kenneth Nichols. Wu was frustrated with her lack of professorships and volunteered to help out in the project. In the beginning, Wu was assigned to check the radiation effect of the reactor by building her own instruments; later, however, she was contacted for a much bigger role. The newly commissioned B Reactor, the first practical nuclear reactor ever built, which was located at the Hanford Site had run into an unexpected problem, starting up and shutting down at regular intervals. John Archibald Wheeler and partner Enrico Fermi suspected that a fission product, Xe-135, with a half-life of 9.4 hours, was the culprit, and might be a neutron poison or absorber. Segrè then remembered the 1940 PhD thesis that Wu had done for him at Berkeley on the radioactive isotopes of Xe and told Fermi to "ask Ms. Wu".

The paper on the subject was still unpublished, but after Fermi contacted Wu, Segrè visited her dorm room together with Nichols and collected the typewritten draft prepared for the Physical Review. The suspicions of Fermi and Wheeler came true, Wu's paper unknowingly verified that Xe-135 was indeed the culprit for the B Reactor; it turned out to have an unexpectedly large neutron absorption cross-section. Wu, wary of her publication giving information to other nations on the arms race of the war, waited for a few months before November 1944, when she and Segrè submitted a complete study on these results, which was published months before the bombs were used the next year.

Wu also used her findings in radioactive uranium separation to build the standard model for producing enriched uranium to fuel the atomic bombs at the Oak Ridge, Tennessee facility as well as build innovative Geiger counters. Like many involved physicists in their later years, Wu later distanced herself from the Manhattan Project due to its destructive outcome and recommended to the Taiwanese president Chiang Kai-shek in 1962 to never build nuclear weapons. However, she was pleased to know that her family was safe in China. Years later, Wu in a rare occasion opened up on her involvement in building the bomb,

Do you think that people are so stupid and self-destructive? No. I have confidence in humankind. I believe we will one day live together peacefully.

=== Famous early experiments and academic leading career ===
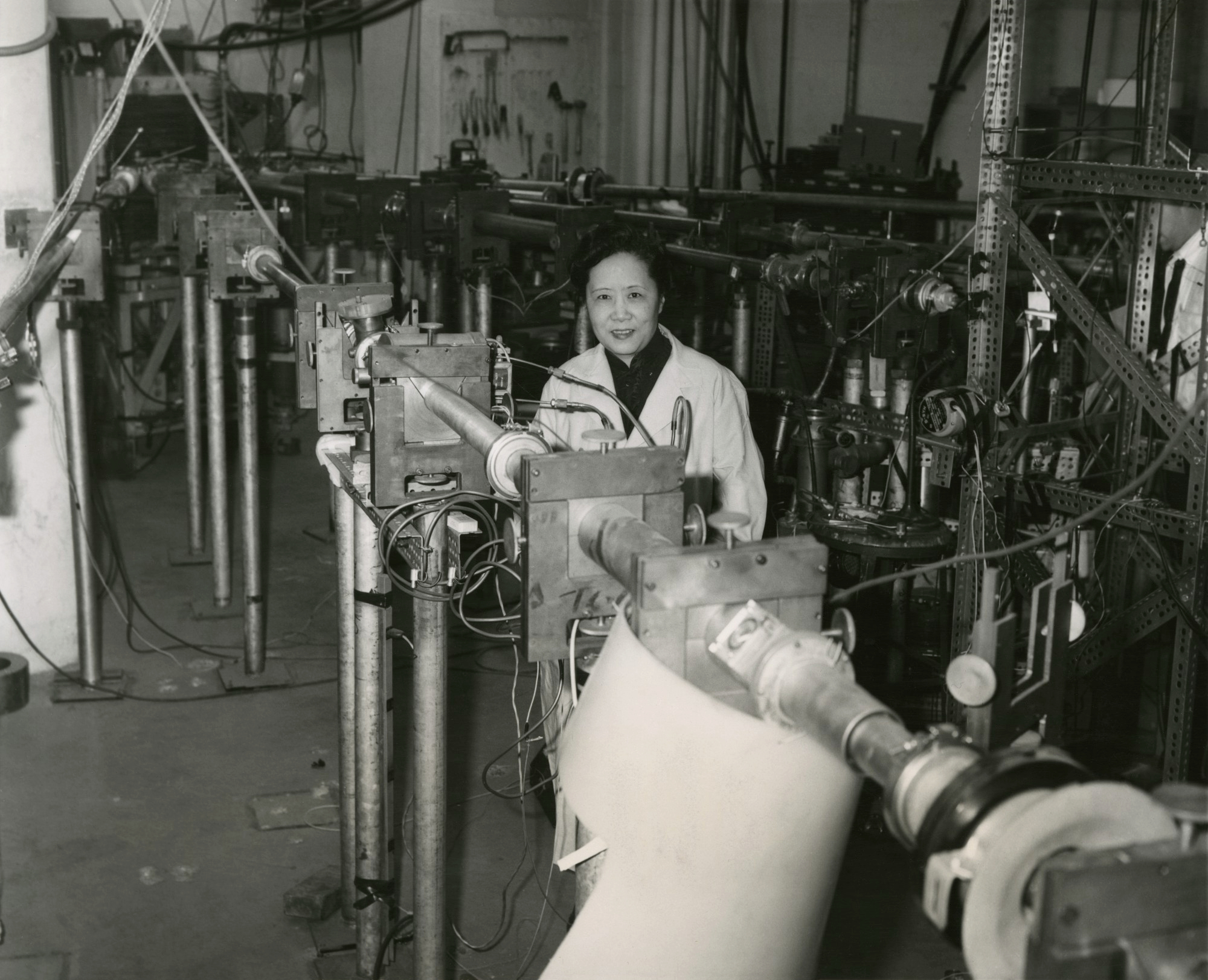
Chien-Shiung Wu in 1963 at Columbia University

After the end of the war in August 1945, Wu accepted an offer of a position as an associate research professor at Columbia. She would remain at Columbia for the rest of her career, and was first named associate professor in 1952, which made her the first woman to become a tenured physics professor in university history.

In November 1949, Wu experimented with the conclusions of Einstein–Podolsky–Rosen (EPR) thought experiment, which called quantum entanglement "spooky action at a distance". Wu was the first to establish the phenomenon and validity of entanglement using photons through observing angular correlation, as her result confirmed Maurice Pryce and John Clive Ward's calculations on the correlation of the quantum polarizations of two photons propagating in opposite directions. Specifically, the experiment carried out by Wu was the first important confirmation of quantum results relevant to a pair of entangled photons as applicable to the EPR paradox.

In the 1970s, she carried out one of the first Bell tests to confirm that quantum mechanics violates Bell's inequalities.

== Chinese Civil War and permanent residency ==
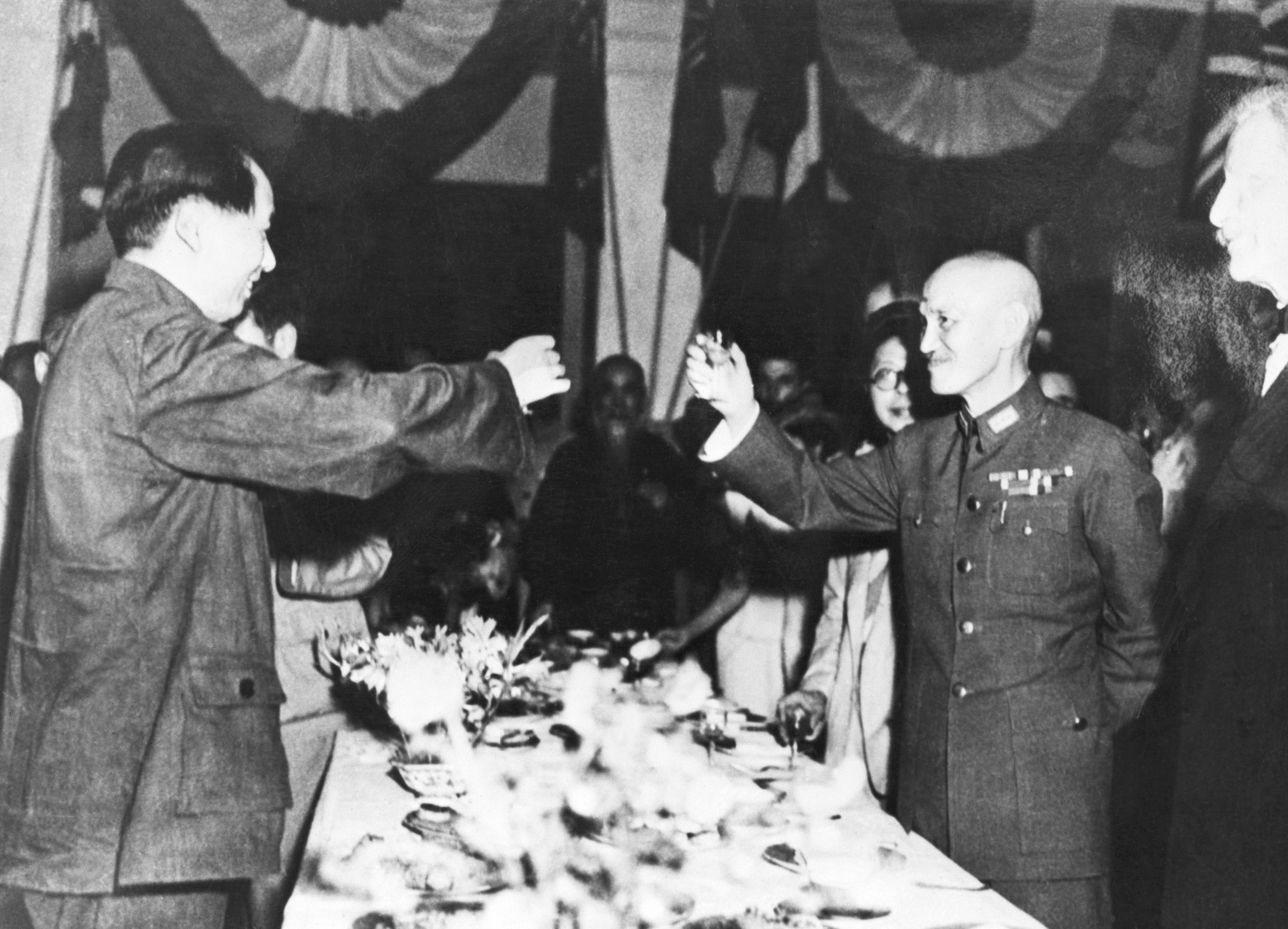
Mao Zedong and Chiang Kai-shek would fight for the fate of the country immediately after the united Chinese forces won the Second World War.

After the Second World War, communication with China was restored, and Wu received a letter from her family, but plans to visit China were disrupted by the Chinese Civil War. Due to the civil war and communist takeover led by Mao Zedong, Wu would not return to China until decades later to meet her surviving uncle and younger brother. Though Wu did not support Mao, she also did not particularly respect the now deposed president Chiang Kai-shek and his wife Soong Mei-ling. Wu found Soong to be class-conscious, while Chiang, now based on Taiwan, was too complacent with foreign affairs and willing to let Soong handle diplomatic issues for him. However she decided to lend a bit more support to the Republic of China or Taiwan, as her teacher Hu carried close ties with the old republic. Due to the war, many were displaced and younger students would leave for the United States, while scholars in America could not return home. She missed China deeply, and would often go with Luke to buy fabric to make her own qipao, which she always wore under her lab coat as a way to remember the country.

Wu was also busy due to the birth of her son, Vincent (袁緯承 Yuán Wěichéng), in 1947. Vincent became a physicist like his parents and attended Columbia, following in Wu's footsteps. By the end of the civil war in 1949, Yuan joined the Brookhaven National Laboratory, and the family bought another home on Long Island. Yuan would regularly travel to Brookhaven on Long Island, and on weekends return to the family's Manhattan home near Columbia University where Wu worked as its first female physics professor. After the communists came to power in China that year, Wu's father wrote urging her not to return. Since her passport had been issued by the Kuomintang government, she found it difficult to travel abroad as places such as Switzerland did not recognize her passport. Sometimes her friend in Switzerland, physicist Wolfgang Pauli, had to secure her special visas just to enter the country. This eventually led to her decision to stay in the United States. With the help of Columbia chairman Charles H. Townes, Wu would become a US citizen in 1954.

== Establishing beta decay ==
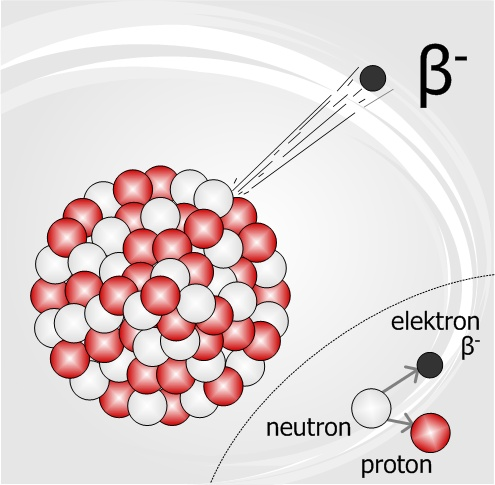
Illustration of beta decay, a concept that Wu proved in its entirety

In her post-war research, Wu, now an established physicist, continued to investigate beta decay. Enrico Fermi had published his theory of beta decay in 1934, but an experiment by Luis Walter Alvarez had produced results at variance with the theory. Wu set out to repeat the experiment and verify the result. Wu was already heavily invested in working on beta decay as she took on the subject at UC Berkeley. In the year 1949, Wu completely established Fermi's theory and showed how beta decay worked, especially in creating electrons, neutrinos, and positrons. Supposedly, most of the electrons should come out of the nucleus at high speeds.

After careful research, Wu suspected that the problem was that a thick and uneven film of copper(II) sulfate (CuSO_{4}) was being used as a copper-64 beta ray source, which was causing the emitted electrons to lose energy. To get around this, she adapted an older form of the spectrometer, a solenoidal spectrometer. She added detergent to the copper sulfate to produce a thin, even film. She then demonstrated that the discrepancies observed were the result of experimental error; her results were consistent with Fermi's theory. The speeds of the electrons that were commonly produced in experiments were now shown to be significantly slower. Thus by analyzing radioactive materials used by previous researchers, she proved that this was the cause of the problem and not from theoretical flaws. Wu thus established herself as the leading physicist on beta decay. Her work on beta decay became hugely beneficial to her later research and to modern physics in general.

== Parity experiment ==
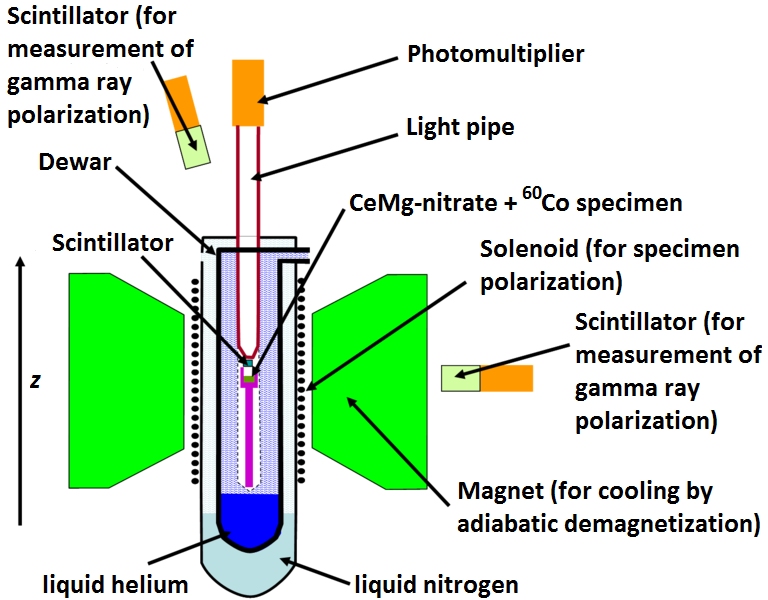
Schematic illustration of the Wu experiment

At Columbia, Wu knew the Chinese-born theoretical physicist Tsung-Dao Lee personally. In the mid-1950s, Lee and another Chinese theoretical physicist, Chen Ning Yang, grew to question a hypothetical law of elementary particle physics, the "law of conservation of parity". One example highlighting the problem was the puzzle of the theta and tau particles, two apparently differently charged, strange mesons. They were so similar that they would ordinarily be considered to be the same particle, but different decay modes resulting in two different parity states were observed, suggesting that Θ^{+} and τ^{+} were different particles, if parity is conserved:

Θ^{+}	→	π^{+} + π^{0}
τ^{+}	→	π^{+} + π^{+} + π^{−}

Lee and Yang's research into existing experimental results convinced them that parity was conserved for electromagnetic interactions and for the strong interaction. For this reason, scientists had expected that it would also be true for the weak interaction, but it had not been tested, and Lee and Yang's theoretical studies showed that it might not hold true for the weak interaction. Lee and Yang worked out a pencil-and-paper design of an experiment for testing conservation of parity in the laboratory. Because of her expertise in choosing and then working out the hardware manufacture, set-up, and laboratory procedures, Wu then informed Lee that she could carry out the experiment.

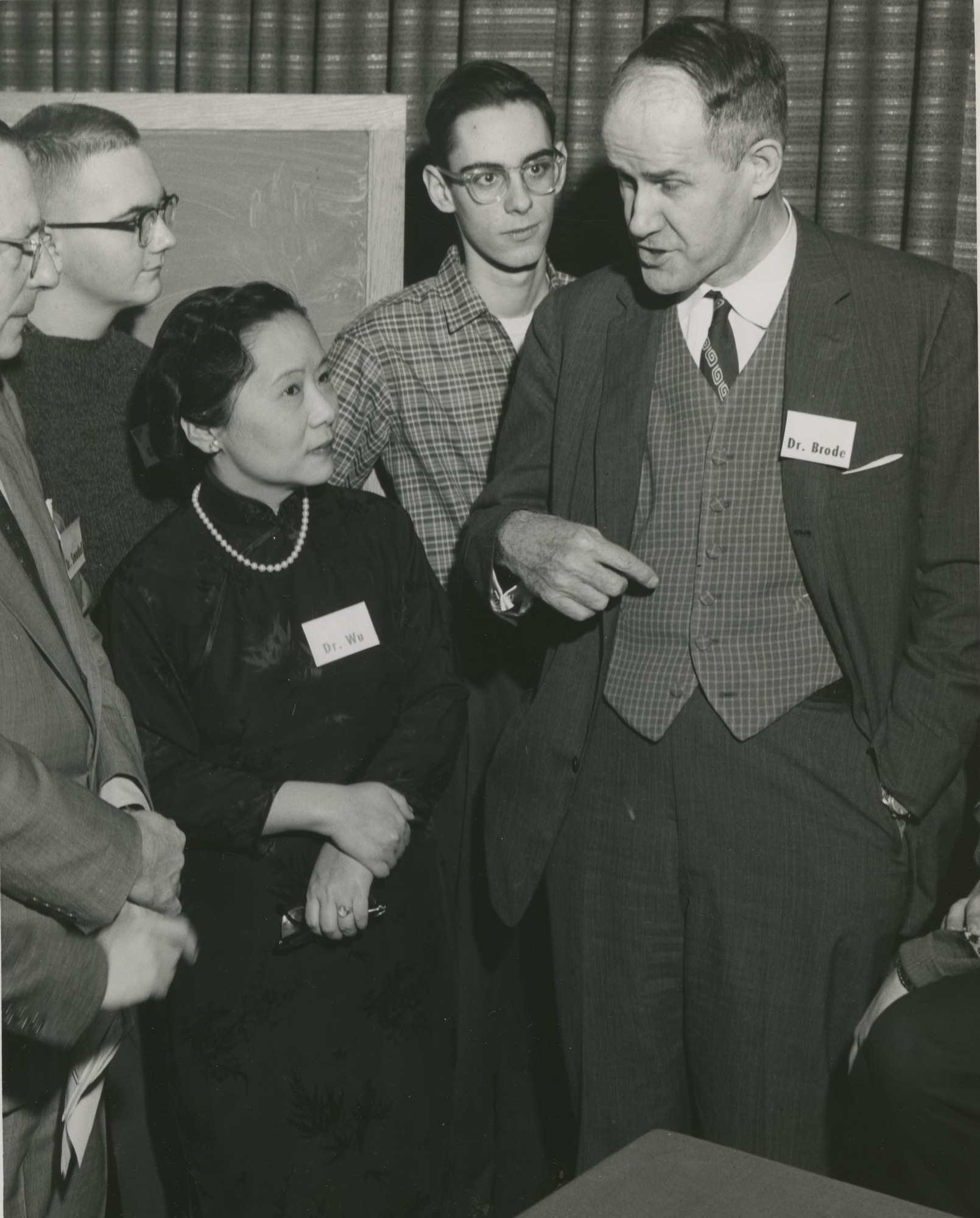
Chien-Shiung Wu (left) with Wallace Brode (right) at Columbia University in 1958

Wu chose to do this by taking a sample of radioactive cobalt-60 and cooling it to cryogenic temperatures with liquid gases. Cobalt-60 is an isotope that decays by beta particle emission, and Wu was also an expert on beta decay. The extremely low temperatures were needed to reduce the amount of thermal vibration of the cobalt atoms to almost zero. Also, Wu needed to apply a constant and uniform magnetic field across the sample of cobalt-60 in order to cause the spin axes of the atomic nuclei to line up in the same direction. For this cryogenic work, she needed the facilities of the National Bureau of Standards and its expertise in working with liquid gases, and traveled to its headquarters in Maryland with her equipment to carry out the experiments.

Lee and Yang's theoretical calculations predicted that the beta particles from the cobalt-60 atoms would be emitted asymmetrically and the hypothetical "law of conservation of parity" was invalid. Wu's experiment showed that this is indeed the case: parity is not conserved under the weak nuclear interactions. Θ^{+} and τ^{+} are indeed the same particle, which is today known as a kaon, K^{+}. This result was soon confirmed by her colleagues at Columbia University in different experiments, and as soon as all of these results were published—in two different research papers in the same issue of the same physics journal—the results were also confirmed at many other laboratories and in many different experiments.

The discovery of parity violation was a major contribution to particle physics and the development of the Standard Model. The discovery actually set the stage for the development of the model, as the model relied on the idea of symmetry of particles and forces and how particles can sometimes break that symmetry. The wide coverage of her discovery prompted the discoverer of fission Otto Frisch to mention that those at Princeton would often say that her experiment was the most impactful since the Michelson–Morley experiment that inspired Einstein's theory of relativity. The AAUW called it the solution to the biggest riddle in science. Beyond showing the distinct characteristic of weak interaction from the other three conventional forces of interaction, this eventually led to the general CP violation or the violation of the charge conjugation parity symmetry. This violation meant researchers could distinguish matter from antimatter and create a solution that would explain the existence of the universe as one that is filled with matter. This is because the lack of symmetry gave the possibility of matter–antimatter imbalance which would allow matter to exist today through the Big Bang.

Lee and Yang were awarded the Nobel Prize for Physics in 1957 for their theoretical work, despite a "firm tradition" of the vast majority of the previous and following prizes being awarded to experimentalists, not theorists. Wu's critical contribution providing the experimental confirmation proving parity violation through her rigorous experiment was omitted by the Nobel committee. Yang and Lee tried to nominate Wu for a future Nobel prize and thanked her in their speeches. An examination by the magazine Physics World of the Nobel archives after the death of Lee and Yang revealed that Wu received a total of 23 Nobel nominations from 18 different physicists between 1958 and 1974. 1988 Nobel laureate Jack Steinberger frequently called it the biggest mistake of the Nobel committee. Wu's role in the discovery was not publicly honored until 1978, when she was awarded the inaugural Wolf Prize. Wu's friend Pauli, who was notable for being the creator of the Pauli exclusion principle, was certain parity was true and was shocked with the discovery. He, like many other known physicists, lost a large hypothetical bet for wagering against the eventual outcome. He later wrote about his feelings on the discovery to Princeton colleague John M. Blatt: "I don't know whether anyone has written you as yet about the sudden death of parity. Miss Wu has done an experiment with beta-decay of oriented Co nuclei which shows that parity is not conserved in β decay. ... We are all rather shaken by the death of our well-beloved friend, parity." He later became even more confounded when he learned that Wu was denied the Nobel prize, and even believed that he had predicted the event through his dream analysis conducted by Dr. Carl Gustav Jung.

== Weak force and conserved vector current ==
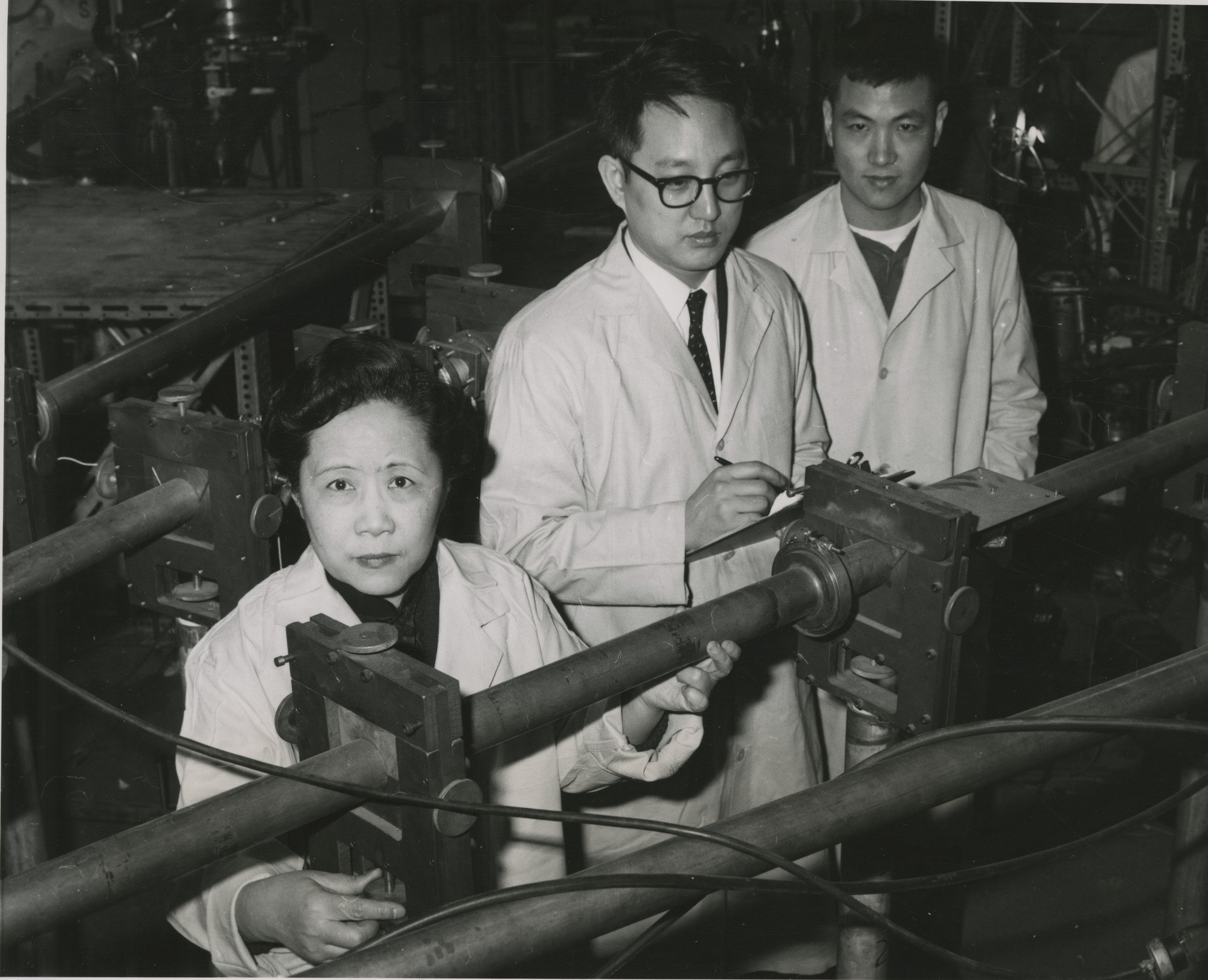
The experiments of Columbia University physicists (left to right) Wu, Y.K. Lee, and L.W. Mo confirmed the theory of conservation of vector current. In the experiments, which took several months to complete, proton beams from Columbia's Van de Graaff accelerator were transmitted through pipes to strike a 2 mm boron target at the entrance to a spectrometer chamber.

Wu quickly became a full professor in 1958, and later on was named the first Michael I. Pupin Professor of Physics in 1973. Some of her impish students called her the Dragon Lady, after the character of that name in the comic strip Terry and the Pirates due to Wu's strictness and high standards of excellence. Regardless of this, Wu actually treated her students like her children and often ate lunch with them as well as got to know their entourages. She would do this while working from 8 am to 7 or 8 in the evening, with her pay still very low until it was drastically increased after Robert Serber was installed as the new chairman. Her discoveries proved to be important in physics and her work even crossed over to biology and medicine, where her contributions became extremely influential to certain studies on the molecular changes in red blood cells that caused sickle cell disease or anemia.

In December 1962, Wu experimentally demonstrated a universal form and more accurate version of Fermi's old beta decay model, confirming the conserved vector current (CVC) hypothesis of Richard Feynman and Murray Gell-Mann on the road to the Standard Model. She would release the results in the succeeding year. In this experiment, she was approached by Gell-Mann after he and Feynman realized they needed an expert on experimental physics to prove their hypothesis. Gell-Mann pleaded to Wu, "How long did Yang and Lee pursue you to follow upon their work?" Their hypothesis was influenced by Wu's demonstration that parity was not conserved, which brought other assumptions that physicists have made about the weak interaction into question. The question was if parity cannot be conserved in weak force interaction, then the conservation of charge conjugation could also be in dispute. Conservation and symmetry were basic laws that held true for electromagnetism, gravity, and the strong interaction, so it had been assumed for decades that they should also hold for the weak interaction until Wu debunked these laws. This was also crucial to the future discovery of the electroweak force.

Wu worked with a number of student assistants including Y.K. Lee, Mo Wei or L.W. Mo, and Lee Rong-Gen from Korea. Using a Van de Graaff accelerator at Columbia with proton, heavy hydrogen, and helium beams, they were able to perform their notable experiment. The beta ray spectra were measured in the magnetometer spectroscopy fifty feet (15 m) from the accelerator. The beta decay sources B-12 and N-12 were produced in the magnetometer. The laboratories were locked during midnight and Mo had to create a duplicate key for everyone to sneak in and out of the laboratory during the wee hours of the morning. Mo would escort Wu to her Manhattan apartment home. Wu's discovery was presented at the Hilton hotel on January 26, 1963. Wu was pleased with the achievement and mentioned that it gave a complete foundation for Fermi's theory of beta decay as well as provide support for the theory of the two-component neutrino, which her parity experiment first established. Feynman was very happy with the announcement and was so proud of the outcome that he called the CVC theory, together with his diagram and work in quantum electrodynamics, one of his finest scientific accomplishments.

Later in the 1960s, Wu conducted more experiments on beta decay, specifically on double beta decay. She went inside a 2,000-foot-deep (610 m) salt mine below Lake Erie in Ohio to investigate on muonic atoms in which muons take the place of electrons in normal atoms. The work conducted here would pave the way for its future discovery in the 1980s.

Wu later wrote a textbook with Steven Moszkowski entitled Beta Decay, which was published in 1966. It was the first comprehensive study on beta decay, and the book quickly became the standard reference on the subject; it remains one of the standard references in the 21st century.

== Later years and social advocacy ==
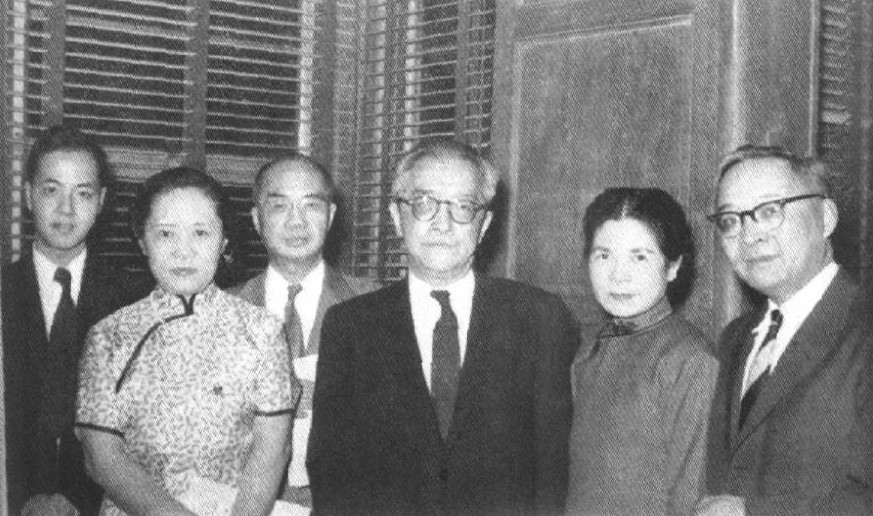
Chien-Shiung Wu with other academics

Wu's older brother died in 1958, her father the next year, and her mother in 1962. The United States State Department had imposed severe restrictions on travel to Communist countries by its citizens, so Wu was not permitted to visit mainland China to attend their funerals. She saw her uncle, Wu Zhou-Zhi, and younger brother, Wu Chien-Hao, on a trip to Hong Kong in 1965. After the 1972 Nixon visit to China, relations between the two countries improved, and she visited China again in 1973. Wu nearly visited in 1956, but decided to stay in the US to finish her famous experiment while her husband visited China. By the time she returned, her uncle and brother had perished during the Cultural Revolution, and the tombs of her parents had been destroyed. She was greeted by Zhou Enlai, who personally apologized for the destruction of the tombs. After this, she returned to mainland China and Taiwan several times.

During the late 20th century, Wu continued to be seen as the top experimental physicist in the world and many continued to ask for her guidance in proving certain hypotheses. Herwig Schopper, who was the director general of CERN, commented that physicists believed "if the experiment was done by Wu, it must be correct." She conducted experiments on Mössbauer spectroscopy and its application in the study of sickle cell anemia. She researched on the molecular changes in the deformation of hemoglobins that cause this form of anemia. She also did research on magnetism in the 1960s. Wu would later work on Bell's theorem, which showed results that confirmed the orthodox interpretation of quantum mechanics.

In later life, Wu became more outspoken. She protested the imprisonment in Taiwan of the in-laws of physicist Kerson Huang in 1959 and of the journalist Lei Chen in 1960. With the help of her teacher Hu Shih, Huang's in-laws were eventually released on bail. Lei's sentence was reduced to ten years by President Chiang Kai-shek. In 1964, she spoke out against gender discrimination at a symposium at the Massachusetts Institute of Technology. "I wonder," she asked her audience, "whether the tiny atoms and nuclei, or the mathematical symbols, or the DNA molecules have any preference for either masculine or feminine treatment", which garnered heavy applause from the audience. When men referred to her as Professor Yuan, she immediately corrected them and told them that she was Professor Wu.

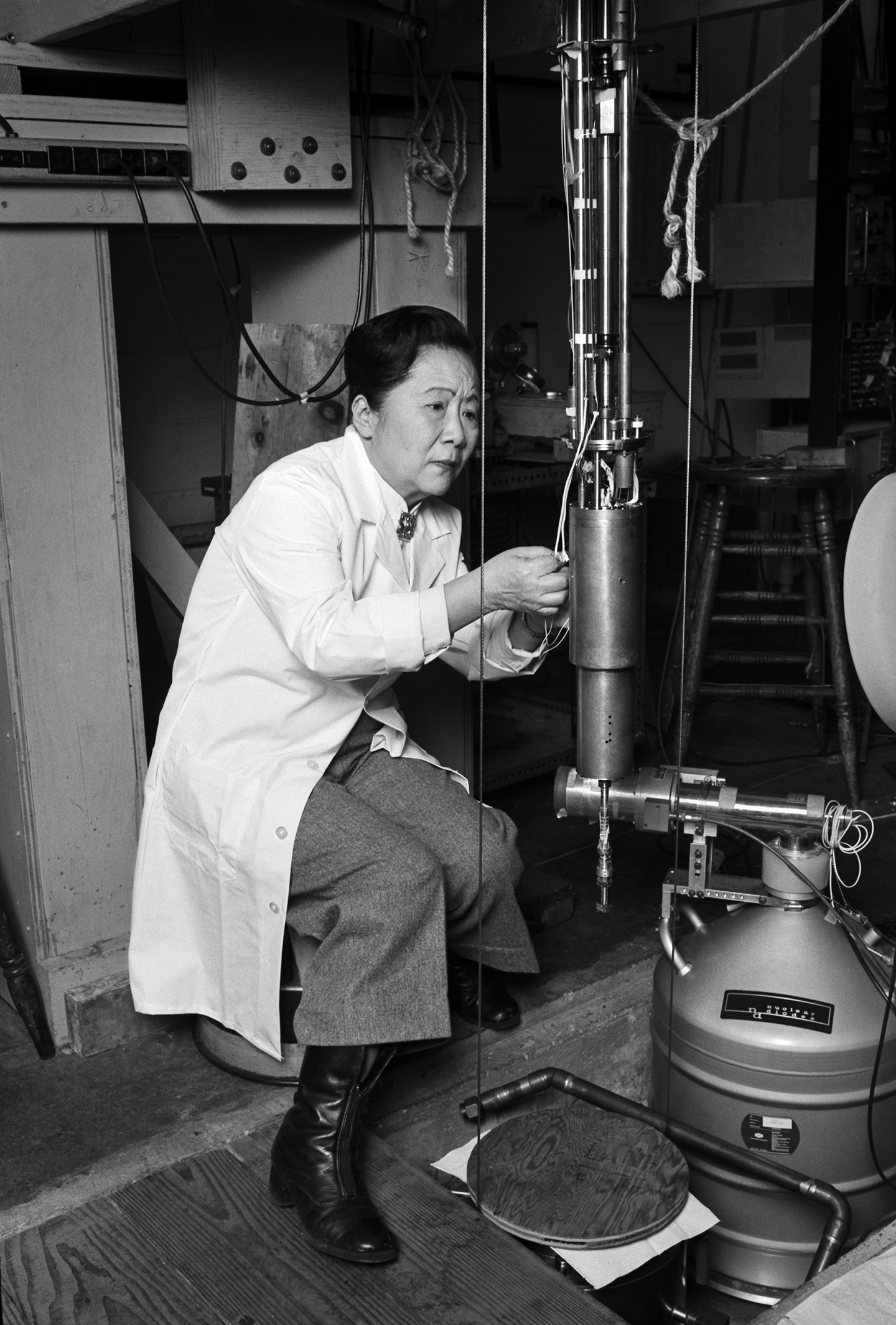
Chien-Shiung Wu photographed in 1978 by Lynn Gilbert

In 1975, physics department chairman Serber discovered that Wu had a much lower pay than her male colleagues but that she had never reported on it, so he adjusted her pay to make it equal to that of her male counterparts even if Wu only cared about the research at Columbia. Wu later quipped,

In China there are many, many women in physics. There is a misconception in America that women scientists are all dowdy spinsters. This is the fault of men. In Chinese society, a woman is valued for what she is, and men encourage her to accomplishments, yet she remains eternally feminine.

Wu's advocacies and conviction maintained a strong priority for the advancement of the sciences. Later in 1975 as the first female president of the American Physical Society, Wu met with President Gerald Ford to formally request him to create an advisory scientific body for the president, which President Ford granted and signed into law the formation of the Office of Science and Technology Policy.

Wu also continued to be an advocate for human rights issues as she protested the crackdown in China that followed the Tiananmen Square massacre of 1989. In 1978, she was awarded the first Wolf Prize in Physics. One of its criteria considered those who were thought deserving to win a Nobel Prize without receiving one. She retired in 1981 and became a professor emerita.

== Final years and legacy ==
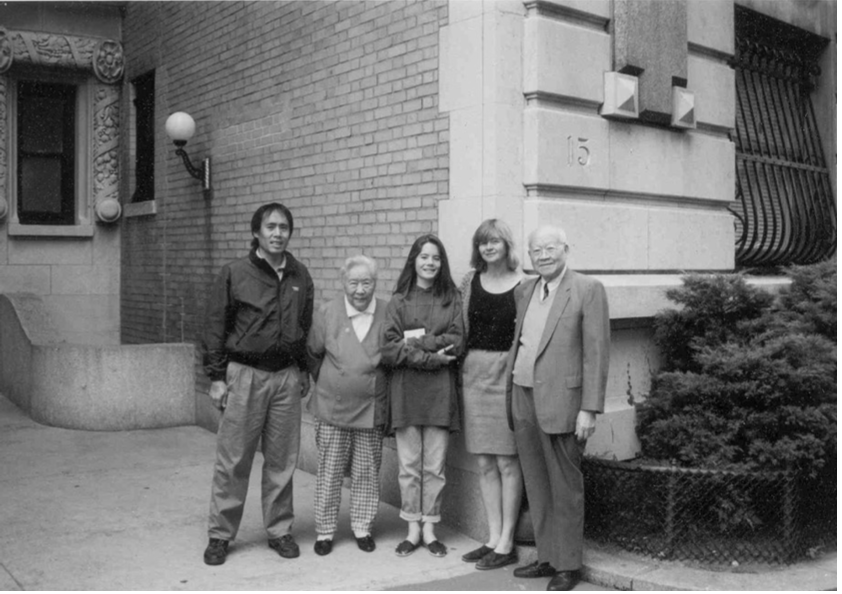
Chien-Shiung Wu (second from left) with granddaughter Jada Wu Hanjie (center) and the rest of the family

Wu would spend most of her time in her later years visiting the People's Republic of China, Taiwan, and different American states. She became renowned for her steadfast promotion of teaching STEM subjects to all students regardless of gender or any other discriminating cause. Wu suffered a stroke on February 16, 1997, in New York City. An ambulance rushed her to St. Luke's–Roosevelt Hospital Center, where she was pronounced dead. Her granddaughter, Jada Wu Hanjie, remarked, "I was young when I saw my grandmother, but her modesty, rigorousness and beauty were rooted in my mind. My grandmother had emphasized much enthusiasm for national scientific development and education, which I really admire."

During her retirement, Columbia hosted a celebration "to honor the First Lady of Physics", which garnered a huge reception, and subsequently held a banquet at the Qian Jia Fu restaurant along Broadway. The Polish-American award-winning professor Isidor Rabi called Wu one who had made greater contributions to science than Marie Curie, in spite of her nickname as the "Chinese Madame Curie". Maurice Goldhaber later quipped, "People avoid doing experiments in beta decay, simply because they know that Wu Chien-Shiung will do a better job than anybody!" The other physicists were surveyed for their opinions on the finest female physicists, with Wu, Lise Meitner, and Curie coming in different orders depending on their standards; Leon Lederman noted that Curie and Wu were equally above Meitner while Valentine Telegdi ranked Wu first among female physicists. Regardless of the differing views, Wu was highly regarded by members of the scientific community.

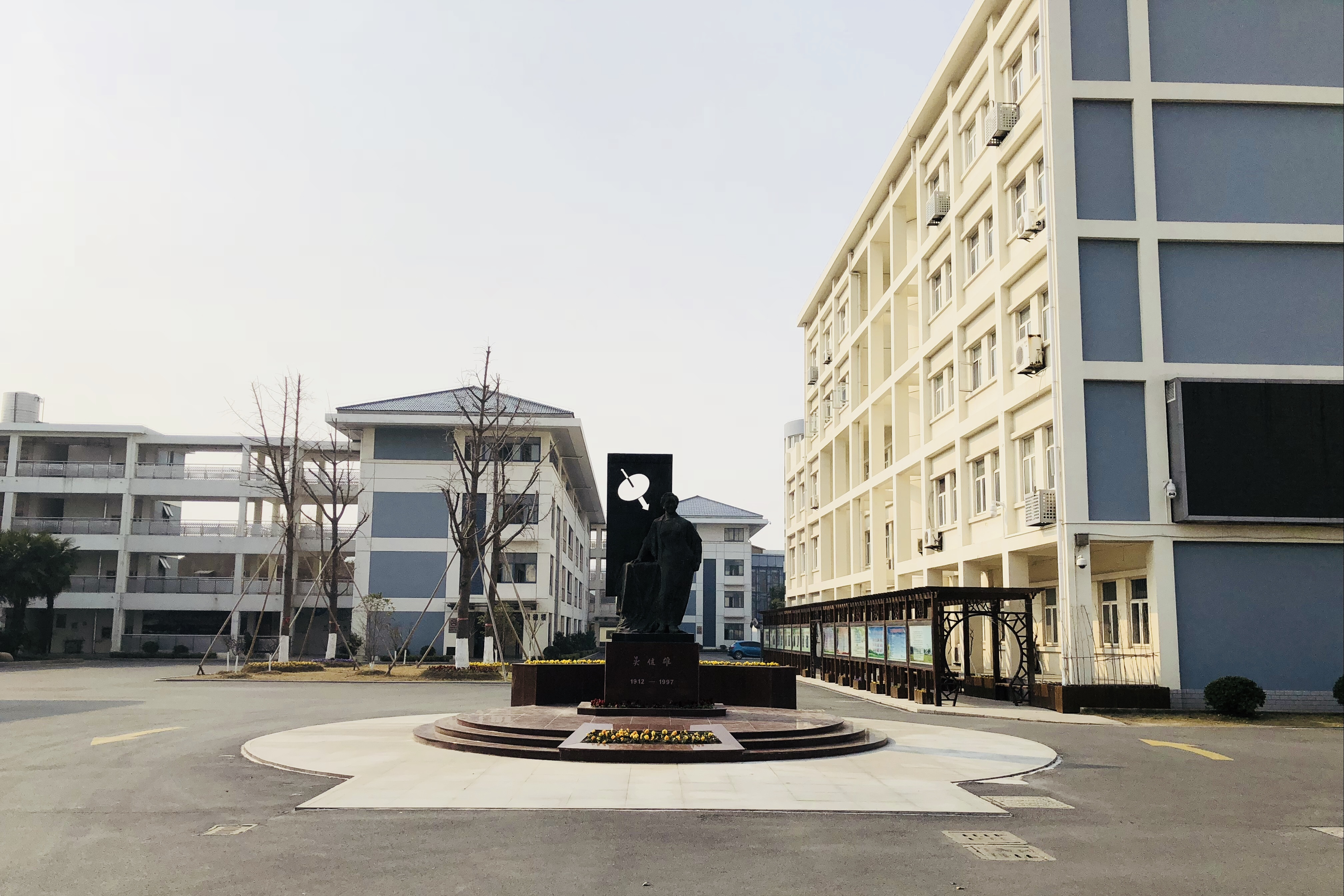
Monument to Wu at the Ming De Middle School campus in Liuhe

In accordance with Wu's wishes, her ashes were buried in the courtyard of the Ming De School that her father had founded and that she had attended when she was younger.

== Honors, awards, and distinctions ==
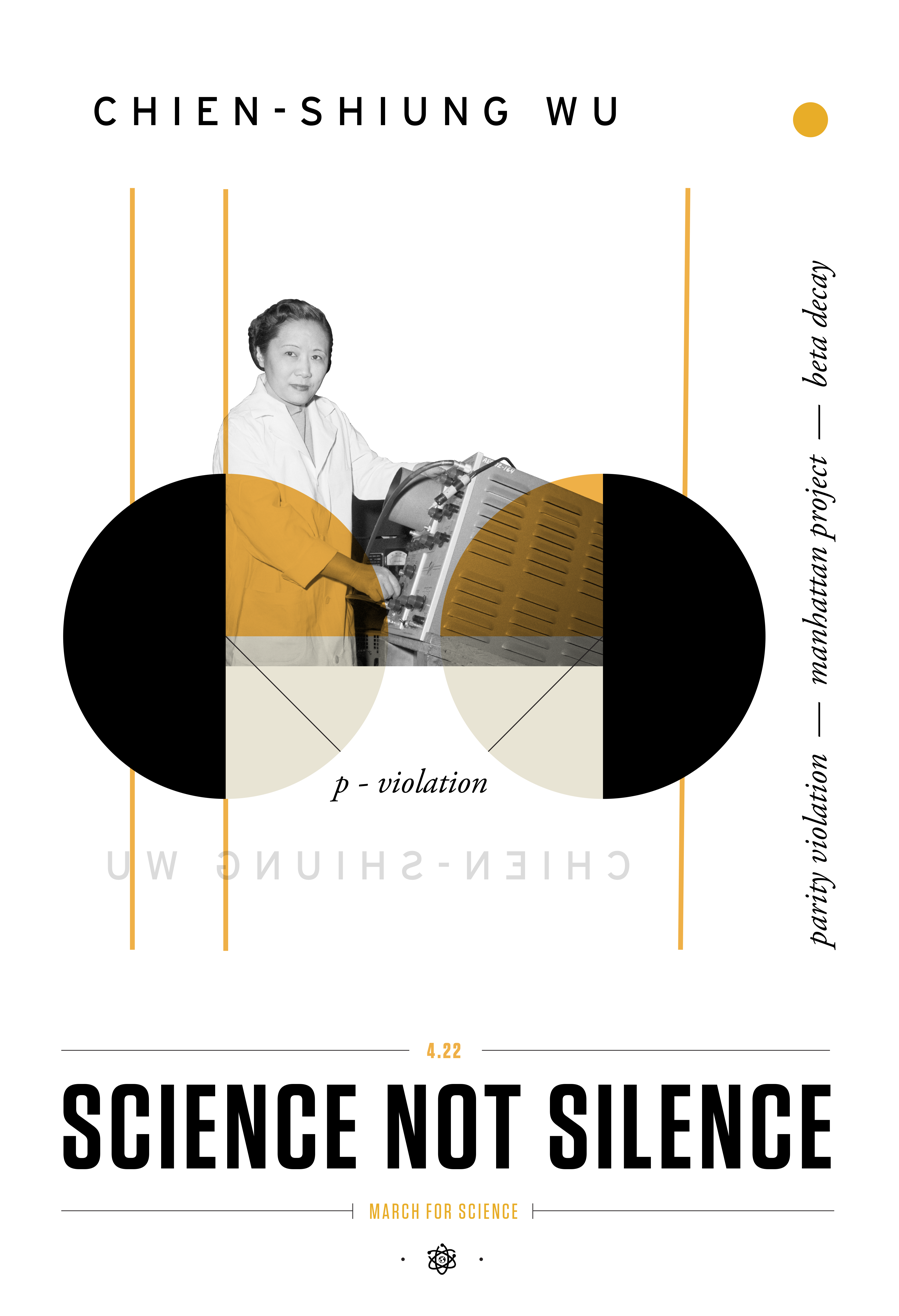
Chien-Shiung Wu honored as a female scientist in the same class as Marie Curie

Wu receiving the National Medal of Science from president Gerald Ford, October 1976

- Elected a fellow of the American Physical Society (1948)
- Elected a member of the U.S. National Academy of Sciences (1958)
- Wu was the first woman with an honorary doctorate from Princeton University. The citation called Wu, "top woman experimental physicist in the world". (1958)
- Achievement Award, American Association of University Women (1959)
- Honorary degree from Smith College (1959)
- Wu won the Research Corporation Award, and dedicated the award to her teacher Hu Shih. The award is now housed in Nangang District, Taipei, where Hu's memorial is located. Wu spent two hours at the memorial, which was built after Hu suddenly collapsed and succumbed to a heart attack in the middle of a conference. Wu and her husband happened to be in that conference which was supposed to celebrate her career. (1958)
- John Price Wetherill Medal, The Franklin Institute (1962)
- American Association of University Women Woman of the Year Award (1962)
- First female to win the Comstock Prize in Physics, National Academy of Sciences (1964)
- Chi-Tsin Achievement Award, Chi-Tsin Culture Foundation (1965)
- Received an Sc.D. from Yale University (1967)
- Honorary Fellow of the Royal Society of Edinburgh (1969)
- Wu was bestowed an honorary L.L.D. from the Chinese University of Hong Kong. The citation stated, "The charming lady who is being honoured on this occasion is reputed as the world's foremost female experimental physicist ... Dr. Wu has made one of the greatest contributions to the knowledge of the universe." (1969)
- First Pupin Professor in the history of Columbia University, which went with a citation that described Wu as "the first lady of physics research" (1973)
- Scientist of the Year Award, Industrial Research magazine (1974)
- Honorary degree from Harvard University (1974)
- Tom W. Bonner Prize, American Physical Society (1975)
- First female president of the American Physical Society (1975)
- Honorary doctorate from Dickinson College (1975)
- First female to be honored with the National Medal of Science in Physics, which is the highest presidential honor for American scientists (1975)
- First person selected to receive the Wolf Prize in Physics (1978)
- Woman of the Year award from the St. Vincent Culture Foundation under UNESCO, which was presented by the president of Italy (1981)
- Honorary degree from the University of Southern California (1982)
- Honorary degree from the University at Albany, SUNY
- Honorary degree from Columbia University (1982)
- Lifetime Achievement Award from Radcliffe College, Harvard University
- Honorary professorship from the University of Padua, where Wu was asked to deliver a lecture in the same hall as the Renaissance astronomer Galileo Galilei (1984)
- Golden Plate Award of the American Academy of Achievement (1984)
- Wu received only the second Blue Cloud Award from the Institute of China for her outstanding contributions to cultural exchanges between China and America. (1985)
- To celebrate the centennial of the creation of the Statue of Liberty, 80 distinguished Americans were chosen to be honored with the Ellis Island Medal of Honor. Wu was the only physicist in a group that featured Rosa Parks, Gregory Peck, and Muhammad Ali, whom she took a photo with on the day of the ceremony. (1986)
- Awarded only the second mayor's award of honor from then-New York City mayor Ed Koch (1986)
- Honorary degree from National Central University (1989)
- Has an asteroid (2752 Wu Chien-Shiung) named after her (1990)
- Pupin Medal, Columbia University (1991)
- Wu was awarded the Science for Peace prize from the Ettore Majorana Centre for Scientific Culture in Erice, Italy "for her intense and vast scientific activity that has permitted the understanding of weak forces and for her engagement in the promotion of the role of women in science." The Ettore Majorana Centre, founded by the Sicilian government in 1963, is known worldwide for its scholarly meetings and graduate institutes with a membership of more than 56,000 scientists from over 100 nations. (1992)
- Elected one of the first foreign academicians of the Chinese Academy of Sciences (1994)
- Nobel laureates Chen-Ning Yang, Tsung-Dao Lee, Samuel C. C. Ting, and Yuan Tse Lee, together with other top physicists, established the Wu Chien-Shiung Education Foundation in Taiwan with the goal of promoting science to youths in Chinese communities worldwide. The foundation holds camps every summer that invite the top students in Science to participate, with many Nobel laureates of any ethnicity usually speaking in the camp's lectures. Competitions and face-to-face discussions are usually held with prestigious scholarships serving as the top prizes. Dialogues are all in Mandarin with professional translators who are hired to translate from other languages in real time. (1995)
- Inducted into the National Women's Hall of Fame (1998)
- Southeast University, one of the successors of National Central University, opened a college named in her honor. Wu was previously honored as an honorary professor in the university in 1990. (2003)
- The Taicang Normal School of Jiangsu Province was renamed into the "Suzhou Chien-shiung Institute of Technology" in her honor. (2004)
- First female nuclear and particle physicist to be honored with a street name at CERN called, Route Wu, and the second woman given the honor after Marie Curie (2004)
- Mingde Middle School held a memorial ceremony at Wu's cemetery located in the school campus. The 1,300 sq m cemetery was designed as a rounded viewing stand surrounded by flowers and trees, and was built by Southeast University in collaboration with the famous architect Ioeh Ming Pei. An educational activity titled "Promoting the Scientific Spirit of Chien-Shiung, and Be a Person of Moral Integrity" was launched among primary and middle school students across the city. Honorary president Jada Wu Hanjie was in attendance, as she habitually visited the school every month. The ceremony was sponsored by the Taicang municipal government. (2012)
- The Suzhou Chien-shiung Institute of Technology celebrated Wu's 100th birthday with a 23-foot (7.0 m) bronze statue that weighed 8 tons at the center of the school in front of Xinjing lake, where it is surrounded by pine trees and cypresses. It was designed by Professor Zhang Yonghao and was based on her visit to the White House in the 1970s. Together with the statue was the inauguration of the Chien-Shiung Wu museum in the school. Other monuments, structures, and edifices include a stone inscription of Wu's biography, a large park called the Knowledge Square, and plenty of other tributes. (2012)
- Portrait was added into New York City Hall (2020)
- For the centennial of the 19th Amendment that gave suffragettes the right to join fair elections, Time magazine released the 100 Women of the Year. This list was to represent each woman of the year from 1920 to 2019. The woman of the year would be the female counterpart to the disused, so-called "man of the year" that Time changed to "person of the year". Wu was on the magazine cover where she was called the woman of the year in 1945 for her crucial role in the Manhattan Project. This was the same year when US President Harry Truman was labeled man of the year for fully utilizing the very bomb Wu built, which he tested on Japan. (2020)
- Wu became only the eighth full-time physicist to be honored with a United States Postal Service postage stamp. The others include John Bardeen, Feynman, Fermi, Millikan, Einstein, and Josiah Gibbs. (2021)
- The United States Postal Service issued a Forever stamp featuring a portrait of Wu, designed by Ethel Kessler with art from Kam Mak. (2021)

== Bibliography ==
- Wu, C.-S. (1950). "Recent Investigation of the Shapes of β-Ray Spectra". Reviews of Modern Physics. 22 (4): 386–398. Bibcode:1950RvMP...22..386W. doi:10.1103/RevModPhys.22.386.
- Wu, C. S.; Moszkowski, S. A. (1966). Beta Decay. New York: Interscience Publishers. LCCN 65-21452. OCLC 542299.
- Wu, C.-S. (1975). "Can We Save Basic Research?". Physics Today. 281 (12): 88. Bibcode:1975PhT....28l..88W. doi:10.1063/1.3069274.

== See also ==
- Timeline of women in science
- Chien-Shiung Wu College
