= Comparison of EM simulation software =

The following table lists software packages with their own article on Wikipedia that are nominal EM (electromagnetic) simulators;

Name	License	Windows	Linux	3D	GUI	Convergence detector	Mesher	Algorithm	Area of application
NEC	open source	Yes	Yes	Yes	In some distributions	Yes	manual	MoM	Antenna modeling, especially in Amateur Radio. Widely used as the basis for many GUI-based programs on many platforms. Version 2 is open source, but Versions 3 and 4 are commercially licensed.
Momentum	commercial	Yes	Yes	Partial	Yes	Yes	equidistant	MoM	For passive planar elements development, integrated into Keysight EEsof Advanced Design System.
Ansys HFSS	commercial	Yes	Yes	Yes	Yes	Yes	Automatic adaptive	FEM, FDTD, PO, Hybrid FEBI, MoM, and Eigenmode expansion (EME).	For antenna/filter/IC packages, Radome, RFIC, MMIC, Antenna Placement, Waveguide (radio frequency), EMI, Frequency selective surfaces (FSS), Electromagnetic metamaterials, Composite Material, RCS-Mono and Bi development.
XFdtd	commercial	Yes	Yes	Yes	Yes	Yes	Automatic (project optimized)	FDTD	RF and microwave antennas, components, and systems, including mobile devices. MRI coils, radar, waveguides, SAR validation.
AWR Axiem	commercial	Yes	Yes	Yes	Yes	Yes	Automatic, Hybrid	MoM	PCBs, multi-layer PCBs, LTCC, HTCC, on-chip passives, printed antennas. Integrated into Microwave Office.
AWR Analyst	commercial	Yes	Yes	Yes	Yes	Yes	Automatic and adaptive	FEM	3D structurers (including 3D antennas), waveguides, 3D filters, PCBs, multi-layer PCBs, LTCC, HTCC, on-chip Passives, printed antennas. Integrated into Microwave Office.
JCMsuite	commercial	Yes	Yes	Yes	Yes	Yes	Automatic, error-controlled	FEM	Nano- and micro-photonic applications (light scattering, waveguide modes, optical resonances).
QuickField	commercial and free editions	Yes	No	Partial	Yes	Yes	Automatic or Manual	FEM	General purpose for research, engineering and educational use, includes AC, DC and Transient Magnetics, Electrostatics, AC and DC Conduction, Transient Electrics, Heat Transfer and multiphysics
COMSOL Multiphysics	commercial	Yes	Yes	Yes	Yes	Yes	Automatic	FEM, MoM, BPM, ray tracing	General purpose
FEKO	commercial	Yes	Yes	Yes	Yes	Yes	Automatic or manual; adaptive	MoM, FEM FDTD MLFMM PO RL-GO UTD	For antenna analysis, antenna placement, windscreen antennas, microstrip circuits, waveguide structures, radomes, EMI, cable coupling, FSS, metamaterials, periodic structures, RFID
Elmer FEM	open source (GPL)	Yes	Yes	Yes	Yes	Yes	manual, or can import other mesh formats	FEM	General purpose, includes 2D and 3D magnetics solvers, both static and harmonic. 3D solver is based on the Whitney AV formulation of Maxwell's equations.
VSimEM	Commercial	Yes	Yes	Yes	Yes	Yes	Automatic, variable mesh	FDTD, PIC, finite volume	Simulating electromagnetics, and electrostatics in complex dielectric and metallic environments. Phased array antenna systems, radar equipment, and photonics.
Meep	open source (GPL)	No	Yes	Yes	No	Yes	manual	FDTD, FDFD	Optics and photonics (nanophotonics, photonic crystals, plasmonics, silicon photonics, metamaterials)
CST Studio Suite	commercial	Yes	Yes	Yes	Yes	Yes	Automatic, adaptive	FDTD/FIT, FEM, MLFMM, MoM, SBR, PIC	General purpose – statics, low-frequency, microwaves and RF, terahertz, photonics, particle accelerators, electronics
MPB	open source (GPL)	No	Yes	Yes	No	Yes	manual	PWEM	For band diagram and modal analysis of periodic structures (photonic crystals and metamaterials)
