= Meep (software) =

Software for electromagnetic simulations

- Developers: ab initio research group, Massachusetts Institute of Technology
- Release: 2006; 20 years ago
- Stable release: 1.34.0 / July 9, 2026; 3 months ago
- Written in: C++, Python, Scheme
- Operating system: Linux, macOS
- Type: Simulation software
- License: GNU General Public License
- Website: meep.readthedocs.io/en/latest/
- Repository: github.com/NanoComp/meep

Meep (MIT Electromagnetic Equation Propagation) is a free and open-source software package for electromagnetic simulations, developed by ab initio research group at Massachusetts Institute of Technology in 2006. Operating under Unix-like systems, it uses finite-difference time-domain method with perfectly matched layer or periodic boundary conditions for field computation.

Meep supports dispersive, nonlinear and anisotropic media, and features subpixel smoothing and parallelization, as well as an embedded frequency-domain solver for steady-state fields and eigenmode expansion. The package was subsequently expanded to include an adjoint solver for topology optimization and inverse design, and a Python interface.

The software is widely adopted by optics and photonics communities, with applications including the analysis and design of metalenses and photonic crystals.

== See also ==
- Comparison of EM simulation software
- List of computer simulation software
