= Kane S. Yee =

Chinese-American electrical engineer and mathematician

- 余树江
- Born: March 26, 1934 (age 92); Guangzhou, Republic of China
- Citizenship: United States
- Education: University of California, Berkeley
- Known for: Finite-difference time-domain method
- Scientific career
- Fields: Electrical engineering; Applied mathematics
- Workplaces: Lockheed Missiles and Space Company; Lawrence Livermore National Laboratory; University of Florida; Kansas State University
- Theses: Analysis of a cylindrical cavity resonator with finite wall thickness (1958); Boundary-value problems for Maxwell's equations (1963)
- Doctoral advisor: Bernard Friedman

Kane Shee-Gong Yee (born March 26, 1934) is a Chinese-American electrical engineer and mathematician. He is best known for introducing the finite-difference time-domain method (FDTD) in 1966.

His research interests include numerical electromagnetics, fluid dynamics, continuum mechanics and numerical analysis of partial differential equations.

== Biography ==
Yee was born on March 26, 1934, in Guangzhou, Republic of China. He received his B.S. and M.S. in electrical engineering from University of California, Berkeley in 1957 and 1958, respectively. He has completed his PhD in applied mathematics department at the same university under the supervision of Bernard Friedman in 1963; his dissertation involved the study of boundary value problems for Maxwell's equations. From 1959 to 1961, he was employed at Lockheed Missiles and Space Company, researching diffraction in electromagnetic waves.

In 1966, Yee published a paper on the use of a finite difference staggered grids algorithm in the solution of Maxwell's equations. Yee was initially motivated by his self-studies in Fortran to develop the method. Appearing on IEEE Transactions on Antennas and Propagation, the article received little attention at the time of its release. The incorrect numerical stability conditions on Yee's paper were corrected by Dong-Hoa Lam in 1969 and Allen Taflove and Morris E. Brodwin in 1975. The method was subsequently renamed as finite-difference time-domain method in 1980. FDTD is also referred as Yee algorithm, with its specific discretized grid being known as Yee lattice or Yee cell.

Between 1966 and 1984, Yee became a professor of electrical engineering and mathematics at the University of Florida and later at Kansas State University. He became a consultant to Lawrence Livermore National Laboratory in 1966, working on microwave vulnerability problems at the same institute from 1984 to 1987. In 1987, he became a research scientist at Lockheed Palo Alto Research Lab, working on computational electromagnetics problems and retiring in 1996.

== Selected publications ==
- Yee, Kane S. (May 1966). "Numerical Solution of Initial Boundary Value Problems Involving Maxwell's Equations in Isotropic Media" (PDF). IEEE Transactions on Antennas and Propagation. 14 (3): 302–307. Bibcode:1966ITAP...14..302Y. doi:10.1109/TAP.1966.1138693. S2CID 122712881.
- Taflove, A.; Umashankar, K.R.; Beker, B.; Harfoush, F.; Yee, K.S. (February 1988). "Detailed FD-TD analysis of electromagnetic fields penetrating narrow slots and lapped joints in thick conducting screens". IEEE Transactions on Antennas and Propagation. 36 (2): 247–257. Bibcode:1988ITAP...36..247T. doi:10.1109/8.1102.
- Yee, K.S.; Ingham, D.; Shlager, K. (March 1991). "Time-domain extrapolation to the far field based on FDTD calculations". IEEE Transactions on Antennas and Propagation. 39 (3): 410–413. Bibcode:1991ITAP...39..410Y. doi:10.1109/8.76342.
- Zivanovic, S.S.; Yee, K.S.; Mei, K.K. (March 1991). "A subgridding method for the time-domain finite-difference method to solve Maxwell's equations". IEEE Transactions on Microwave Theory and Techniques. 39 (3): 471–479. Bibcode:1991ITMTT..39..471Z. doi:10.1109/22.75289.
- Yee, K.S.; Chen, J.S.; Chang, A.H. (June 1992). "Conformal finite difference time domain (FDTD) with overlapping grids". IEEE Antennas and Propagation Society International Symposium 1992 Digest. pp. 1949–1952 vol.4. doi:10.1109/APS.1992.221489. ISBN 0-7803-0730-5. S2CID 121846336.
- Yee, Kane S.; Chen, Jei S. (March 1997). "The finite-difference time-domain (FDTD) and the finite-volume time-domain (FVTD) methods in solving Maxwell's equations". IEEE Transactions on Antennas and Propagation. 45 (3): 354–363. Bibcode:1997ITAP...45..354Y. doi:10.1109/8.558651.

== See also ==
- Computational electromagnetics
- Finite difference method
- Finite difference time-domain method
- Finite volume method
