= OPTOS formalism =

OPTOS (optical properties of textured optical sheets) is a simulation formalism for determining optical properties of sheets with plane-parallel structured interfaces. The method is versatile as interface structures of different optical regimes, e.g. geometrical and wave optics, can be included. It is very efficient due to the re-usability of the calculated light redistribution properties of the individual interfaces. It has so far been mainly used to model optical properties of solar cells and solar modules but it is also applicable for example to LEDs or OLEDs with light extraction structures.

== History ==
The development of the OPTOS formalism started in 2015 at the Fraunhofer Institute for Solar Energy Systems ISE in Freiburg, Germany. The mathematical formulation has been described in detail in several open access publications. A basic version of the code including documentation with function references has been available since the end of 2015 at the homepage of Fraunhofer ISE. Continuous updates and a list of OPTOS related publications can be found on ResearchGate.

== OPTOS simulation procedure ==
One key aspect of OPTOS simulations is the division of the modeled system into interface and propagation regions. The light redistribution properties are calculated with the most appropriate method for each interface individually and depending on the relevant structure dimension. Large scale structures can for example be modeled via ray tracing while for interfaces with structure dimensions in the range of the wavelength wave optical approaches like RCWA, FDTD or FEM can be used.

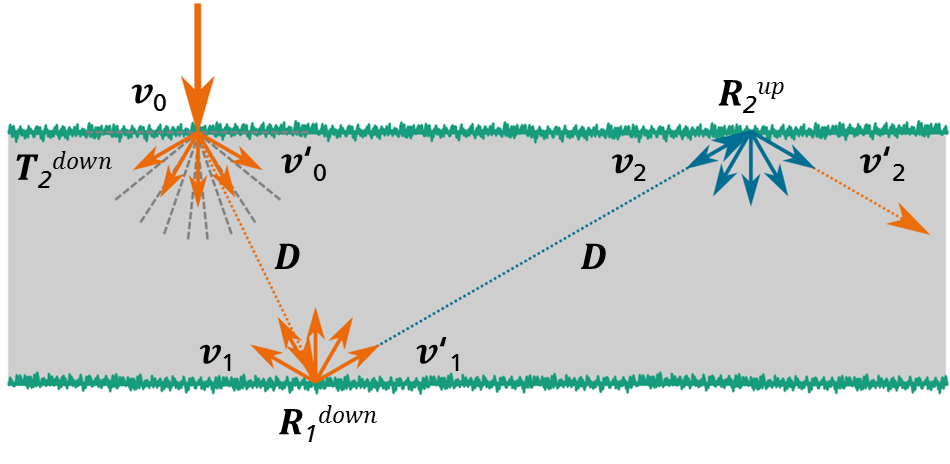
Simulation procecure of the OPTOS formalism

== System description ==
The discretization of the complete angular space into a fixed number of angle channels, as second key aspect of the OPTOS formalism, allows representing the angular power distribution within the system by a vector v which consists of one entry for each angle channel. The value of the entry is the power fraction of the corresponding angle channel with respect to the total incident power.

== Interface interaction ==
The light redistribution properties of an interface are represented by the so-called reflection and transmission matrices, R and T. They store for each of the angle channels the redistribution information into other angle channels for light incident onto a certain interface with a certain wavelength. There are in total four different redistribution matrices for each interface, characterized by the incidence direction as well as reflection or transmission redistribution.

== Propagation through the sheet ==
The incoherent propagation of light through the sheet can also be represented by a matrix. If no light redistribution takes occurs on the path, the propagation matrix D is a diagonal matrix. The single entries consist of the Lambert-Beer absorption factor, including cosine of the polar angle and the absorption coefficient of the respective material.

== Calculation of optical properties ==
Using the pre-calculated matrices described above, optical properties like reflectance, transmittance or absorptance within the sheet can be calculated via matrix multiplications [2–4] and can be performed within seconds or minutes using a standard personal computer. Also a depth-dependent absorption profile can be calculated. This is of special importance for the subsequent electrical simulation of structured silicon solar cells.

== OPTOS simulation characteristics ==
=== Strengths ===
- Versatility – Optical systems with interface structures operating in different optical regimes can be accurately simulated. The redistribution properties of each interface are modeled individually with the most suitable method.
- Efficiency - The re-usability of the redistribution allow for the very fast simulation of different structure combinations, sheet thickness variations and the optical analysis with respect to different angles of incidence.
- Linear polarization can be taken into account by exchanging each entry of the power distribution vector with two entries, one for each polarization direction. Each matrix entry has to be exchanged with a two by two matrix taking also the redistribution between different polarization directions into account.

=== Limitations ===
OPTOS couples redistribution properties of different interfaces. If there is no accurate modeling technique to calculate redistribution matrices, such interfaces cannot be included in OPTOS. OPTOS models the propagation through the sheet incoherently. If the sheet thickness becomes very low and interference effects play a significant role, this needs to be handled coherently and not as “thick” sheet. However, as coherently modeled sub-system, it can be included in OPTOS as effective interface. Circular or elliptical polarization effects are not taken into account as all phase information is neglected during the propagation.

== Application Examples ==
The main application of OPTOS has so far been the simulation of:

- Solar cells with different front and rear side structures such as random pyramids, the isotexture, the honeycomb texture or diffractive gratings.
- The layer stack of solar panels, including the effect of the encapsulation onto the optical solar cell properties as well as the investigation of different angles of incidence.
- Complex optical interactions in photovoltaic systems with nanowire solar cells.
- The OPTOS formalism has been incorporated into the open-source software RayFlare. This software also allows the user to calculate appropriate redistribution matrices using various methods including the transfer-matrix method, ray tracing, and rigorous coupled-wave analysis.

Alternative fields of application could be:

- LEDs or OLEDs with light extraction structures
- Display technology, for example brightness enhancement films
