= MPB (software) =

Software

- Developers: ab initio research group, Massachusetts Institute of Technology
- Release: 1999; 27 years ago
- Stable release: 1.12.0 / April 3, 2025; 19 months ago
- Written in: C
- Operating system: Linux, macOS
- Type: Simulation software
- License: GNU General Public License
- Website: mpb.readthedocs.io/en/latest/
- Repository: github.com/NanoComp/mpb

MPB (MIT Photonic Bands) is a free and open-source software package for electromagnetic analysis of periodic structures with an emphasis on photonic crystals. It was developed by Steven G. Johnson and collaborators at ab initio research group at Massachusetts Institute of Technology in 1999. Operating under Unix-like systems and being scriptable in Python, it uses the frequency domain plane wave expansion method with block-iterative algorithms and Fast Fourier transform for modal analysis. The solver is able to analyze lossless and dispersionless anisotropic materials, including birefringent and gyrotropic media.

MPB is widely used by band diagram analysis of photonic crystals by the photonics community, with uses in the studies on optical waveguides, photonic-crystal fibers, negative refraction and photonic topological insulators. The software also serves as a complimentary module to the general-purpose electromagnetic simulation software Meep, also developed by the ab initio research group.

== See also ==
- Comparison of EM simulation software
- List of computer simulation software
