= XFdtd =

XFdtd is electromagnetic simulation software with a very wide variety of applications in RF circuit, antenna, military/defense, medical EM, photonics, radar, component, metamaterial, and related fields. It originally stood for X (Window System) Finite Difference Time Domain and was first developed in the mid 1990s by Remcom Incorporated of State College, PA in the United States. XFdtd includes full wave (FDTD), electrostatic, thermal-biological, circuit, and 2D Eigen solver and integrates with PO/MEC, and GTD/UTD method solvers.

== See also ==
- Computational electromagnetics
