= SMM =

SMM may refer to:

== Codes ==
- Musasa language, ISO 639-3 code
- Semporna Airport, IATA code

== Media and entertainment ==
- Super Mario Maker, 2015 video game
- Social media marketing

== Science ==
- S-methylmethionine, a derivative of methionine
- Science Museum of Minnesota
- Single-molecule magnet
- Soft Magnetic Materials Conference
- Solar Maximum Mission or SolarMax, an artificial satellite
- Stepwise mutation model, of allelic frequencies

== Technology ==
- Maxwell (microarchitecture), a GPU microarchitecture
- Scattering-matrix method, to solve Maxwell's equations
- Storage modification machine, a type of pointer machine in computing
- System Management Mode, of a x86 CPU

== Other uses ==
- Church of St. Mary Magdalene (Toronto), a church in Toronto, Canada
- OSCE Special Monitoring Mission to Ukraine, a civilian observer mission by the Organization for Security and Cooperation in Europe
- Master of Sacred Music, a degree
- Sex Money Murda, a street gang in the eastern United States
- Single monthly mortality, for prepayment of loan
- Smoldering multiple myeloma, a type of cancer
- Steenkampskraal Monazite Mine, a mine in South Africa

== See also ==
- Santa Monica Mountains National Recreation Area, SMMNRA
