= Simulia =

Simulia may refer to:

- Simulia (company)
- Simulia (Odisha Vidhan Sabha constituency)
