= Scattering-matrix method =

In computational electromagnetics, the scattering-matrix method (SMM) is a numerical method used to solve Maxwell's equations, related to the transfer-matrix method.

== Principles ==
SMM can, for example, use cylinders to model dielectric/metal objects in the domain. The total-field/scattered-field (TF/SF) formalism where the total field is written as sum of incident and scattered at each point in the domain:

$$E_{tot} = E_{inc} + E_{scatt} \$$

By assuming series solutions for the total field, the SMM method transforms the domain into a cylindrical problem. In this domain total field is written in terms of Bessel and Hankel function solutions to the cylindrical Helmholtz equation. SMM method formulation, finally helps compute these coefficients of the cylindrical harmonic functions within the cylinder and outside it, at the same time satisfying EM boundary conditions.

Finally, SMM accuracy can be increased by adding (removing) cylindrical harmonic terms used to model the scattered fields.

SMM, eventually leads to a matrix formalism, and the coefficients are calculated through matrix inversion. For N-cylinders, each scattered field modeled using 2M+1 harmonic terms, SMM requires to solve a N(2M + 1) system of equations.

== Advantages ==
SMM, is a rigorous and accurate method deriving from first principles. Hence, it is guaranteed to be accurate within limits of model, and not show spurious effects of numerical dispersion arising in other techniques like Finite-difference time-domain (FDTD) method.

== See also ==
- Eigenmode expansion
- Finite-difference time-domain method
- Finite element method
- Maxwell's equations
- Method of Lines
