= RCWA =

RCWA may refer to:

- Wang-an Airport, an airport in Penghu, Taiwan (ICAO code: RCWA)
- Rigorous coupled-wave analysis, a computational electromagnetic method
