= Joshua Medow =

American neurosurgeon

- Born: 1973 (age 52–53) (Note: In 2011, Medow was reported to be 38); Skokie, Illinois, US
- Spouse: Tricia Schweppe

Academic background
- Education: BS, biomechanics/kinesiology, MD, University of Illinois College of Medicine; PhD, MS, University of Wisconsin School of Medicine and Public Health

Joshua Eric Medow (born 1973) is an American neurosurgeon. He is an associate professor of neurosurgery at the University of Wisconsin School of Medicine and Public Health and inventor of the "Digital Intern." Medow also invented a device which allows doctors to track cranial pressure in a child with hydrocephalus.

== Early life and education ==
Medow was born and raised in Skokie, Illinois to a Vietnam War veteran father. By the age of 10, he bought himself a Commodore 64 and taught himself computer programming. As a result, Medow originally intended to pursue computer engineering, but changed his pursuits after his cousin died of leukemia. Medow said his father "generally dislikes doctors" and considered his career choice his "last chance at rebellion."

Medow went on to earn his Bachelor of Science and Medical degree from the University of Illinois College of Medicine and his Master's degree from the University of Wisconsin School of Medicine and Public Health.

== Career ==
Medow joined UW Health University Hospital after completing his neurosurgical fellowship in endovascular neurosurgery at the University of Wisconsin. He founded UW Health's Neurocritical Intensive Care Unit (ICU) at UW Hospital and Clinics in 2008 which included 16-beds per each dedicated neurocritical care unit. As an assistant professor of neurosurgery and biomedical engineering, Medow was the recipient of a three-year, $300,000 award from The Hartwell Foundation to "refine a new implantable device that will allow parents to easily monitor the pressure inside a child’s head." With this grant, he began developing an implantable intracranial pressure (ICP) monitor to track patients brain pressure. The device consisted of a tiny sensor embedded in a patient's skull which would display the intracranial pressure. In recognition of his invention, he received the Rising Star Physician Excellence Award.

Drawing from inspiration from a former neurosurgeon professor, Medow collaborated with Susan Hagness and Nader Behdad to develop a different approach to thermal therapies. They discovered that high-frequency microwaves could offer a comparable ablation zone to existing low-frequency antennas. As a result, the three professors received a $390,000 grant from the National Science Foundation (NSF) to design smaller ablation antennas that can reach tumors through less invasive methods. By 2014, Medow was continuing to run the ICU but required more staff to effectively manage patients there. As a result, he launched a startup in 2014 titled Integrated Vital Medical Dynamics and created the "Digital Intern." The aim of the "Digital Intern" was to decrease the amount of time physicians spend in the ICU monitoring patients by alerting a doctor when patients’ lab test results don't come back normal. During its testing, Medow stated the software sustained organ donors, reduced costs and blood usage by about 50 percent.
