= IEEE Transactions on Electromagnetic Compatibility =

- Discipline: Electromagnetic compatibility, electromagnetic interference
- Language: English
- Edited by: Tzong-Lin Wu

Publication details
- Former names: IRE Transactions on Radio Frequency Interference; IEEE Transactions on Radio Frequency Interference
- History: 1959-present
- Publisher: IEEE Electromagnetic Compatibility Society
- Frequency: Bimonthly
- Impact factor: 2.006 (2020)

Standard abbreviations
- ISO 4: IEEE Trans. Electromagn. Compat.

Indexing
- CODEN: IEMCAE
- ISSN: 0018-9375 (print); 1558-187X (web)
- LCCN: sn78000466

Links
- Journal homepage; Online access

IEEE Transactions on Electromagnetic Compatibility is a peer-reviewed scientific journal published bimonthly by the IEEE Electromagnetic Compatibility Society. It covers electromagnetic compatibility (EMC) and electromagnetic interference, as well as computational electromagnetics and signal integrity methods for EMC problems. Its current editor-in-chief is Tzong-Lin Wu, professor of electrical engineering at National Taiwan University.

The journal was founded in 1959 under the name IRE Transactions on Radio Frequency Interference by Institute of Radio Engineers. According to the Journal Citation Reports, the journal has a 2020 impact factor of 2.006.
