= Rigorous coupled-wave analysis =

Semi-analytic method of computational electromagnetism

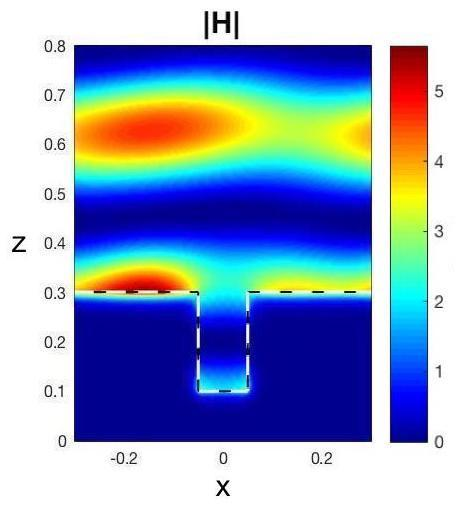
Analysis of plane wave scattering from a subwavelength plasmonic grating with RCWA method

Rigorous coupled-wave analysis (RCWA), also known as Fourier modal method (FMM), is a semi-analytical method in computational electromagnetics that is most typically applied to solve scattering from periodic dielectric structures. It is a Fourier-space method so devices and fields are represented as a sum of spatial harmonics.

== Description ==
The method is based on Floquet's theorem that the solutions of periodic differential equations can be expanded with Floquet functions (or sometimes referred as a Bloch wave, especially in the solid-state physics community). A device is divided into layers that are each uniform in the z direction. A staircase approximation is needed for curved devices with properties such as dielectric permittivity graded along the z-direction.

Electromagnetic modes in each layer are calculated and analytically propagated through the layers. The overall problem is solved by matching boundary conditions at each of the interfaces between the layers using a technique like scattering matrices. To solve for the electromagnetic modes, which are decided by the wave vector of the incident plane wave, in periodic dielectric medium, Maxwell's equations (in partial differential form) as well as the boundary conditions are expanded by the Floquet functions in Fourier space. This technique transforms the partial differential equation into a matrix-valued ordinary differential equation as a function of height over the periodic media. The finite representation of these Floquet functions in Fourier space renders the matrices finite, thus allowing the method to be feasibly solved by computers.

== Fourier factorization ==
Being a Fourier-space method it suffers several drawbacks. Gibbs phenomenon is particularly severe for devices with high dielectric contrast. Truncating the number of spatial harmonics can also slow convergence and techniques like fast Fourier factorization (FFF) should be used. FFF is straightforward to implement for 1D gratings, but the community is still working on a straightforward approach for crossed grating devices. The difficulty with FFF in crossed grating devices is that the field must be decomposed into parallel and perpendicular components at all of the interfaces. This is not a straightforward calculation for arbitrarily shaped devices.

Finally, because the RCWA method usually requires the convolution of discontinuous functions represented in Fourier space, careful consideration must be given to how these discontinuities are treated in the formulation of Maxwell's equations in Fourier space. A key contribution was made by Lifeng Li in understanding the properties of convolving the Fourier transforms of two functions with coincident discontinuities that nevertheless form a continuous function. This led to a reformulation of RCWA with a significant improvement in convergence when using truncated Fourier series.

== Boundary conditions ==
Boundary conditions must be enforced at the interfaces between all the layers. When many layers are used, this becomes too large to solve simultaneously. Instead, RCWA borrows from network theory and calculates scattering matrices. This allows the boundary conditions to be solved one layer at a time. Almost without exception, however, the scattering matrices implemented for RCWA are inefficient and do not follow long standing conventions in terms of how S11, S12, S21, and S22 are defined. Other methods exist, like the enhanced transmittance matrices (ETM), R matrices, and H matrices. ETM, for example, is considerably faster but less memory efficient.

RCWA can be applied to aperiodic structures with appropriate use of perfectly matched layers.

== Applications ==
RCWA analysis applied to a polarized broadband reflectometry measurement is used within the semiconductor power device industry as a measurement technique to obtain detailed profile information of periodic trench structures. This technique has been used to provide trench depth and critical dimension (CD) results comparable to cross-sectional scanning electron microscopy, while having the added benefit of being both high-throughput and non-destructive.

In order to extract critical dimensions of a trench structure (depth, CD, and sidewall angle), the measured polarized reflectance data must have a sufficiently large wavelength range and analyzed with a physically valid model (for example: RCWA in combination with the Forouhi-Bloomer Dispersion relations for n and k). Studies have shown that the limited wavelength range of a standard reflectometer (375 - 750 nm) does not provide the sensitivity to accurately measure trench structures with small CD values (less than 200 nm). However, by using a reflectometer with the wavelength range extended from 190 - 1000 nm, it is possible to accurately measure these smaller structures.

RCWA is also used to improve diffractive structures for high efficiency solar cells. For the simulation of the whole solar cell or solar module, RCWA can be efficiently combined with the OPTOS formalism.

== See also ==
- Finite-difference time-domain (FDTD)
