= Shooting and bouncing rays =

The shooting and bouncing rays (SBR) method in computational electromagnetics was first developed for computation of radar cross section (RCS). Since then, the method has been generalized to be used also for installed antenna performance. The SBR method is an approximate method applied to high frequencies. The method can be implemented for GPU computing, which makes the computation very efficient.

== Theory ==
The first step in the SBR method is to use geometrical optics (GO, ray-tracing) for computing equivalent currents, either on metallic structures or on an exit aperture. The scattered field is thereafter computed by integrating these currents using physical optics (PO), by the Kirchhoff's diffraction formula. The current $\vec{J}$ on a perfect electrical conductor (PEC) is related to the incident magnetic field $\vec{H}_i$ by $\vec{J} = 2\hat{n}\times\vec{H}_i$. This approximation holds best for short wavelengths, and it assumes that the radius of curvature of the scatterer is large compared to the wavelength.

=== Extending SBR for edge diffraction ===
Since the approximation described above assumes that the radius of curvature is large compared to the wavelength, the diffraction from edges needs to be handled separately. The SBR method can be extended with physical theory of diffraction (PTD) in order to include edge diffraction in the model.

== Implementation in commercial software ==
The SBR method is implemented in the following commercial codes:

- Altair Feko (method there known as RL-GO - Ray Launching Geometrical Optics)
- CST Microwave Studio, Asymptotic Solver
- Ansys HFSS SBR+, previously Delcross Savant
- XGTD

== See also ==
- Computational electromagnetics
