= Susan Hagness =

American applied electromagnetics researcher

Susan C. Hagness
- Born: Terre Haute, Indiana, U.S.
- Education: Northwestern University
- Known for: FDTD theory and applications Microwave-based diagnostic and therapeutic applications Dielectric properties of breast tissue Microwave breast imaging Microwave thermal therapies
- Awards: Fellow of IEEE, AAAS, AIMBE, and NAI
- Scientific career
- Fields: Applied electromagnetics; Computational electromagnetics
- Workplaces: University of Wisconsin–Madison
- Doctoral advisor: Allen Taflove
- Website: directory.engr.wisc.edu/ece/Faculty/Hagness_Susan

Susan Carol Hagness is the Philip D. Reed Professor and Chair of the Department of Electrical and Computer Engineering and the Maria Stuchly Professor of Electrical Engineering at the University of Wisconsin-Madison. Prior to her appointment as department chair in 2018, she served as Associate Dean for Research and Graduate Affairs in the College of Engineering for a three-year term. She is also a faculty affiliate of the Department of Biomedical Engineering and a member of the Imaging and Radiation Sciences program within the UW Carbone Cancer Center.

== Early life and education ==
Hagness was born and raised in Terre Haute, Indiana where she was encouraged by Rose-Hulman Institute of Technology mathematics professor Herb Bailey to consider engineering. Hagness earned her BS in electrical engineering with highest honors in 1993 and her PhD in electrical engineering 1998, both at Northwestern University where she pursued research in computational electromagnetics with the now late Allen Taflove. Her graduate student experience working with Alvin Bayliss and Jorge Nocedal on Northwestern's new "Engineering First" curriculum inspired her to pursue a career in academia.

== Career ==
Prof. Hagness's research primarily focuses on electromagnetic interactions with human tissue for medical applications. Her work spans applied research involving diagnostic and therapeutic technology development as well as basic research, such as the dielectric properties of breast tissue at microwave frequencies, that establishes the physical basis for those technologies. Her group has developed non-ionizing sensing and imaging techniques and tools as well as new techniques for non-invasive microwave hyperthermia and minimally invasive ablation of tumors. Most recently she has expanded her work into electric-pulse delivery to enhance gene therapy and microwave remote sensing for cranberry crop yield estimation. She has co-authored more than 110 journal papers, nine book chapters, and two editions of a widely adopted textbook on the finite-difference time-domain method in computational electromagnetics. She also holds 13 U.S. patents.

She was the recipient of a 2000 Presidential Early Career Awards for Scientists and Engineer (PECASE). In 2002, she was named one of the world's 100 top young innovators by the Massachusetts Institute of Technology's magazine, Technology Review, and was selected to participate in the National Academy of Engineering's 7th Annual Symposium on Frontiers of Engineering. Additional recognitions of her research, teaching, and mentoring excellence include the UW-Madison Emil H. Steiger Distinguished Teaching Award (2003), the IEEE Engineering in Medicine and Biology Society Early Career Achievement Award (2004), the International Union of Radio Science Issac Koga Gold Medal (2005), the IEEE Transactions on Biomedical Engineering Outstanding Paper Award (2007), the IEEE Education Society Mac E. Van Valkenburg Early Career Teaching Award (2007), the UW System Alliant Energy Underkofler Excellence in Teaching Award (2009), the Physics in Medicine and Biology Citations Prize (2011), the UW-Madison Kellett Mid-Career Award (2011), the Sven Berggren Prize from the Royal Physiographic Society in Lund, Sweden (2015), the UW-Madison Women Faculty Mentoring Program Slesinger Award for Excellence in Mentoring (2017), and UW-Madison College of Engineering awards for teaching (2014), research (2018), and equity and diversity efforts (2021). In 2024, she received a UW-Madison WARF named professorship, which she chose to name in honor of the late Maria Stuchly. Her student mentees have received numerous research recognitions, including three first prize awards in URSI student paper competitions and multiple IEEE AP-S awards.

Hagness was elected a Fellow of the IEEE in 2009 for her "contributions to time-domain computational electromagnetics and microwave medical imaging." She was also named a Fellow of the American Association for the Advancement of Science (AAAS) in 2021 "for distinguished contributions to computational and experimental applied electromagnetics, with an emphasis on bioelectromagnetics and the development of diagnostic and therapeutic technologies for biomedical applications". In 2022 she was elected a Fellow of the American Institute for Medical and Biological Engineering (AIMBE) "for pioneering contributions to diagnostic and therapeutic applications of microwave interactions with human tissue", and a Fellow of the National Academic of Inventors (NAI).

She has held a variety of appointed and elected leadership roles within the IEEE Antennas and Propagation Society, the IEEE Engineering in Medicine and Biology Society, the U.S. National Committee of the International Union of Radio Science (URSI), the ASEE Engineering Research Council, and the Electrical and Computer Engineering Department Heads Association. She was selected as a Fellow in the Committee on Institutional Cooperation (CIC, now the Big Ten Academic Alliance) Academic Leadership Program in 2014–15.

== See also ==
- List of textbooks in electromagnetism
