= Allen Taflove =

American engineer (1949–2021)

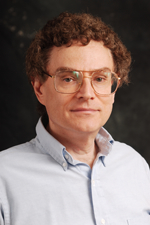
- Born: June 14, 1949; Chicago, Illinois, U.S.
- Died: April 25, 2021 (aged 71)
- Education: Northwestern University
- Known for: Finite-difference time-domain method
- Awards: 2014 IEEE Electromagnetics Award
- Scientific career
- Fields: Electrical engineering; Computational electromagnetics
- Workplaces: Northwestern University
- Thesis: Computation of the electromagnetic fields and induced temperatures within a model of the microwave-irradiated human eye (1975)
- Doctoral advisor: Morris Brodwin
- Doctoral students: Susan Hagness

Allen Taflove (June 14, 1949 – April 25, 2021) was a full professor in the Department of Electrical and Computer Engineering of Northwestern's McCormick School of Engineering, since 1988. Since 1972, he pioneered basic theoretical approaches, numerical algorithms, and applications of finite-difference time-domain (FDTD) computational solutions of Maxwell's equations. He coined the descriptors "finite difference time domain" and "FDTD" in the 1980 paper, "Application of the finite-difference time-domain method to sinusoidal steady-state electromagnetic penetration problems." In 1990, he was the first person to be named a Fellow of the Institute of Electrical and Electronics Engineers (IEEE) in the FDTD area. Taflove was the recipient of the 2014 IEEE Electromagnetics Award with the following citation: "For contributions to the development and application of finite-difference time-domain (FDTD) solutions of Maxwell's equations across the electromagnetic spectrum." He was a Life Fellow of the IEEE and a Fellow of the Optical Society (OSA). His OSA Fellow citation reads: "For creating the finite-difference time-domain method for the numerical solution of Maxwell's equations, with crucial application to the growth and current state of the field of photonics."

In 2011, Taflove was named as an inductee of the Amateur Radio Hall of Fame by CQ Magazine in recognition of his research achievements in computational electrodynamics. He had been an FCC-licensed amateur radio operator since 1963 holding the call sign WA9JLV, and had credited amateur radio with spurring his interest in electrical engineering in general, and electromagnetic fields and waves in particular. He had served for many years as the trustee of the Northwestern University Amateur Radio Society, which operates the FCC-licensed club station W9BGX.

== Early life and education ==
Taflove was born in Chicago, Illinois on June 14, 1949. He received B.S., M.S., and Ph.D. degrees in electrical engineering from Northwestern University in 1971, 1972, and 1975, respectively.

== Finite-difference time-domain method ==
Since about 2000, FDTD techniques have emerged as a primary means to computationally model many scientific and engineering problems dealing with electromagnetic wave interactions with material structures. Current FDTD modeling applications range from near-DC (ultralow-frequency geophysics involving the entire Earth-ionosphere waveguide) through microwaves (radar signature technology, antennas, wireless communications devices, digital interconnects, biomedical imaging/treatment) to visible light (photonic crystals, nanoplasmonics, solitons, microscopy and lithography, and biophotonics). Both commercial FDTD software suites and free-software/open-source or closed-source FDTD projects are available which permit detailed Maxwell's equations modeling of electromagnetic wave phenomena and engineered systems spanning much of the electromagnetic spectrum. To a large degree, all of these software constructs derive directly from FDTD techniques first reported by Taflove and his students over the past 45 years.

== Publications and citations ==
In 1995, Taflove authored the textbook/research monograph, Computational Electrodynamics: The Finite-Difference Time-Domain Method. In 1998, he edited the research monograph, Advances in Computational Electrodynamics: The Finite-Difference Time-Domain Method. Subsequently, he and Susan Hagness of the University of Wisconsin-Madison expanded and updated the 1995 book in a year-2000 second edition, and then further expanded and updated the 2000 second edition in a 2005 third edition. In 2013, Taflove and Ardavan Oskooi of Kyoto University and Steven G. Johnson of MIT edited the research monograph, Advances in FDTD Computational Electrodynamics: Photonics and Nanotechnology.

As of August 21, 2020, in addition to the books noted above, Taflove had authored or co-authored a total of 27 articles or chapters in books and magazines, 152 refereed journal papers, and 14 U.S. patents. In 2002, he was named to the original ISI highly cited researcher list of the Institute for Scientific Information (ISI). His books, journal papers, and U.S. patents have received a total of 42,058 citations according to Google Scholar®, and his h-index is reported as 68 (Google Scholar).

According to a Google Scholar search conducted in September 2012 by the Institute of Optics of the University of Rochester, Taflove's Computational Electrodynamics: The Finite-Difference Time-Domain Method is the 7th most-cited book in physics, with an updated total of 20,666 Google Scholar citations as of Aug. 21, 2020.

The descriptors "finite difference time domain" and "FDTD" coined by Taflove in 1980 have since become widely used, having appeared in this exact form in approximately 140,000 and 250,000 Google Scholar search results, respectively, as of Aug. 21, 2020.

== Research ==
Beginning in 2003, Taflove had collaborated with Vadim Backman of Northwestern University's Biomedical Engineering Department in research aimed at the minimally invasive detection of early-stage human cancers of the colon, pancreas, lung, and ovaries. The techniques being pursued are based upon a spectroscopic microscopy analysis of light backscattered from histologically normal tissue located away from a neoplastic lesion in what has been termed the field effect. This may lead to a new paradigm in cancer screening where, for example, lung cancer could be reliably detected by analyzing a few cells brushed from the interior surface of a person's cheek. On May 5, 2008, a large collaboration headed by Backman (with Taflove as a co-investigator) was awarded a five-year, $7.5-million grant from the National Institutes of Health to pursue this biophotonics technology to develop a noninvasive test for population-wide colon cancer screening.

FDTD modeling has helped establish the fundamental physics foundation of Backman's spectroscopic microscopy technique for early detection of human cancers. Work has progressed from the early FDTD studies reported in Dec. 2008 in Proc. National Academy of Sciences USA to the analytical and FDTD modeling advances reported in July 2013 in Physical Review Letters. The latter paper rigorously shows that spectroscopic microscopy permits determining the nature of deeply subdiffraction three-dimensional refractive-index fluctuations of a linear, label-free dielectric medium in the far zone. Using visible light, this means that statistical fluctuations of intracellular media as fine as 20 nm can be characterized. The resulting wide range of distance scales that can be characterized within a cell may permit correlations to be developed appropriate for field-effect detection of a wide variety of early-stage cancers with clinically useful sensitivity and specificity.

Prior to his death, Taflove was implementing petaflops-scale computational microscopy applications of FDTD in support of Backman's research dealing with the detection of early-stage human cancers and their potential treatment by engineering the physical genomics environment in the nuclei of the cancer cells.

== Teacher and advisor ==
Taflove was the first Northwestern University McCormick School faculty member to be named both Teacher of the Year and Adviser of the Year in the same academic year (2005–06). He was appointed a Northwestern University Charles Deering McCormick Professor of Teaching Excellence (2000–03) and the Bette and Neison Harris Chair in Teaching Excellence (2009–12). In addition, he received the Northwestern Alumni Association Excellence in Teaching Award (2008), and was selected by Northwestern's Associated Student Government for its honor roll of best teachers in 2002, 2003, 2004, 2005, 2007, 2008, 2009, and 2016. In 2010, he received the Chen-To Tai Distinguished Educator Award of the IEEE Antennas and Propagation Society.

Taflove was the adviser or co-adviser of 24 Ph.D. recipients and 5 postdoctoral fellows who have completed their residencies. He was particularly known for his support and advocacy for female engineering students. Six of his advisees (four women and two men) currently hold tenured positions in university electrical engineering departments including the University of Colorado Boulder, the University of Wisconsin-Madison, McGill University, National Cheng Kung University (Taiwan), National Taiwan University, and the University of Utah. Many of his other advisees have held professional positions at major research institutions and companies including MIT Lincoln Laboratory, Jet Propulsion Laboratory, Argonne National Laboratory, U.S. Air Force Research Laboratory, the National Center for Supercomputing Applications, Northrop Grumman, Raytheon, Motorola, Applied Materials, Ball Aerospace & Technologies, and Georgia Tech Research Institute.

== University level textbooks ==
- Allen Taflove & Susan C. Hagness (2005). Computational Electrodynamics: The Finite-Difference Time-Domain Method, 3rd ed. Artech House Publishers. ISBN 1-58053-832-0. Archived from the original on 2018-09-05.
- Allen Taflove; Ardavan Oskooi & Steven G. Johnson (2013). Advances in FDTD Computational Electrodynamics: Photonics and Nanotechnology. Artech House Publishers. ISBN 978-1-60807-170-8.

== Awards ==
- 2010 Chen-To Tai Distinguished Educator Award of the IEEE Antennas and Propagation Society, with the following citation: "For his educational activities and publications, and his impact on undergraduate and graduate students."
- 2014 IEEE Electromagnetics Award, with the following citation: "For contributions to the development and application of finite-difference time-domain (FDTD) solutions of Maxwell's equations across the electromagnetic spectrum."

== See also ==
The following article in Nature Milestones: Photons which illustrates the historical significance of the Finite-difference time-domain method and Taflove's research as related to Maxwell's equations:

- Nature Milestones: Photons -- Milestone 2 (1861) Maxwell's equations

The Google Scholar® search conducted in Sept. 2012 by the Institute of Optics of the University of Rochester for the 12 most-cited books in physics:

- 12 Most-Cited Books in Physics

Taflove's interview, "Numerical Solution," on pages 5 and 6 of the January 2015 focus issue of Nature Photonics marking the 150th anniversary of the publication of Maxwell's equations. Here, Nature Photonics cited Taflove as the "father of the finite-difference time-domain technique":

- Nature Photonics interview
- List of textbooks in electromagnetism
