= Simulia (company) =

Computer-aided engineering company

- Developer: Dassault Systèmes
- Operating system: Windows / Unix
- Type: Finite-element analysis
- License: Proprietary software
- Website: www.3ds.com/products/simulia

Dassault Systèmes Simulia Corp. is a computer-aided engineering (CAE) vendor. Formerly known as Abaqus Inc. and previously Hibbitt, Karlsson & Sorensen, Inc. (HKS), the company was founded in 1978 by David Hibbitt, Bengt Karlsson, and Paul Sorensen, and has its headquarters in Providence, Rhode Island.

In October 2005, Dassault Systèmes acquired Abaqus, Inc. and announced Simulia, the brand encompassing all DS simulation solutions, including Abaqus and Catia Analysis applications. Dassault Systèmes Simulia Corp. is the legal entity that encompasses the Simulia brand.

== Abaqus product suite ==
The Abaqus suite consists of three core products: Abaqus/Standard, Abaqus/Explicit, and Abaqus/CAE (Complete Abaqus Environment). In addition, recent versions of Abaqus (6.10 onwards) include Abaqus/CFD for computational fluid dynamics simulations. Each of these packages offers additional, optional modules that address specialized capabilities required by some customers.

Abaqus/Standard provides analysis technology for traditional implicit finite element analysis, including static, dynamic, and thermal analyses, powered by a range of contact and nonlinear material options.

Abaqus/Explicit specializes in analysis technology tailored for transient dynamics and quasi-static analyses, employing explicit time integration methods. This approach proves suitable for various applications, including drop tests, crushing scenarios, and manufacturing processes.

Abaqus/CAE provides a complete modeling and visualization environment for Abaqus analysis products.

Abaqus/CFD provides advanced computational fluid dynamics capabilities, with pre- and post-processing support in Abaqus/CAE. These simulation capabilities address a range of nonlinear, coupled fluid-thermal and fluid-structural problems.

=== Simulia ===
In addition to developing the pre-existing Abaqus portfolio, DS has also developed the Simulia V5 and V6 product suites, which aim to combine modelling and simulation into a single tool.

=== List of Products ===
As of 2026, Simulia contains:

- Computational Fluid Dynamics (CFD)
- Structural Simulations (via Finite Element Analysis)
- Computational Electromagnetics
- Multibody Finite Element Analysis
- Vibro-acoustic Analysis
- Automation and Optimization products
- AI simulation tools

== CST Studio Suite ==
CST Studio Suite
- Electric field simulation of a PIFA antenna in CST Studio Suite
- Developer: Simulia
- Release: 1998 (as CST Microwave Studio); 2005 (as CST Studio Suite)
- Stable release: 2018
- Operating system: Microsoft Windows and Linux
- Type: EM simulation software
- License: Proprietary commercial software
- Website: www.cst.com

CST Studio Suite is a computational electromagnetics tool developed by Dassault Systèmes Simulia. It contains several different simulation methods, including the finite integration technique (FIT), finite element method (FEM), transmission line matrix (TLM), multilevel fast multipole method (MLFMM) and particle-in-cell (PIC), as well as multiphysics solvers for other domains of physics with links to electromagnetics.

PIC simulation of the multipactor effect.

As an electromagnetic design tool, CST Studio Suite is chiefly used in industries such as telecommunications, defense, automotive, aerospace, electronics, and medical equipment. One application of CST Studio Suite is the design and placement of antennas and other radio-frequency components. The antenna systems on the BepiColombo Mercury Planetary Orbiter were developed using CST Studio Suite to investigate their radiation pattern and possible electromagnetic interference.

Electromagnetic compatibility (EMC) – the analysis and mitigation of interference and electromagnetic environmental effects – is another application, because simulation allows potential issues to be identified earlier in the design process than physical testing alone can. Similarly, CST Studio Suite is also used to analyze signal integrity – the quality of electric signal transmission – on printed circuit boards and other electronics.

Other areas of research where CST Studio Suite has been applied include accelerator physics, biological electromagnetics, nanotechnology, and metamaterials.
