= Eigenmode expansion =

Computational electrodynamics technique

Eigenmode expansion (EME) is a computational electrodynamics modelling technique. It is also referred to as the mode matching technique or the bidirectional eigenmode propagation method (BEP method). Eigenmode expansion is a linear frequency-domain method.

It offers very strong benefits compared with FDTD, FEM and the beam propagation method for the modelling of optical waveguides, and it is a popular tool for the modelling linear effects in fiber optics and silicon photonics devices.

== Principles of the EME method ==
Eigenmode expansion is a technique to simulate electromagnetic propagation which relies on the decomposition of the electromagnetic fields into a basis set of local eigenmodes that exists in the cross section of the device. The eigenmodes are found by solving Maxwell's equations in each local cross-section. The method can be fully vectorial provided that the mode solvers themselves are fully vectorial.

In a typical waveguide, there are a few guided modes (which propagate without coupling along the waveguide) and an infinite number of radiation modes (which carry optical power away from the waveguide). The guided and radiation modes together form a complete basis set. Many problems can be resolved by considering only a modest number of modes, making EME a very powerful method.

As can be seen from the mathematical formulation, the algorithm is inherently bi-directional. It uses the scattering matrix (S-matrix) technique to join different sections of the waveguide or to model nonuniform structures. For structures that vary continuously along the z-direction, a form of z-discretisation is required. Advanced algorithms have been developed for the modelling of optical tapers.

== Mathematical formulation ==
In a structure where the optical refractive index does not vary in the z direction, the solutions of Maxwell's equations take the form of a plane wave:

$$E(x,y,z) = E(x,y)e^{i \beta z}$$

We assume here a single wavelength and time dependence of the form $\exp(i \omega t)$.

Mathematically $E(x,y) e^{i \beta z}$ and $\beta$ are the eigenfunction and eigenvalues of Maxwell's equations for conditions with simple harmonic z-dependence.

We can express any solution of Maxwell's equations in terms of a superposition of the forward and backward propagating modes:
$$E(x,y,z)= \sum_{k=1}^M {\left(a_k e^{i \beta_k z}+ b_k e^{-i \beta_k z}\right)E_k(x,y)}$$
$$H(x,y,z)= \sum_{k=1}^M {\left(a_k e^{i \beta_k z}- b_k e^{-i \beta_k z}\right)H_k(x,y)}$$

These equations provide a rigorous solution of Maxwell's equations in a linear medium, the only limitation being the finite number of modes.

When there is a change in the structure along the z-direction, the coupling between the different input and output modes can be obtained in the form of a scattering matrix. The scattering matrix of a discrete step can be obtained rigorously by applying the boundary conditions of Maxwell's equations at the interface; this requires calculation of the modes on both sides of the interface and their overlaps. For continuously varying structures (e.g. tapers), the scattering matrix can be obtained by discretising the structure along the z-axis.

== Strengths of the EME method ==
- The EME method is ideal for the modelling of guided optical components, for fibre and integrated geometries. The mode calculation can take advantage of symmetries of the structure; for instance cylindrically symmetric structures can be modelled very efficiently.
- The method is fully vectorial (provided that it relies on a fully vectorial mode solver) and fully bidirectional.
- As it relies on a scattering matrix approach, all reflections are taken into account.
- Unlike the beam propagation method, which is only valid under the slowly varying envelope approximation, eigenmode expansion provides a rigorous solution to Maxwell's equations.
- It is generally much more efficient than FDTD or FEM as it does not require fine discretisation (i.e. on the scale of the wavelength) along the direction of propagation.
- The scattering matrix approach provides a flexible calculation framework, potentially allowing users to only re-calculate modified parts of the structure when performing parameter scan studies.
- It is an excellent technique to model long devices or devices composed of metals.
- Fully analytical solutions can be obtained for the modelling of 1D+Z structures.

== Limitations of the EME method ==
- EME is limited to linear problems; nonlinear problems may be modelled using iterative techniques.
- EME may be inefficient for modeling structures requiring a very large number of modes, which limits the size of the cross-section for 3D problems.

== See also ==
- Computational electromagnetics
- Method of lines
