= Finite-difference frequency-domain method =

Numerical solution method of computational electromagnetics

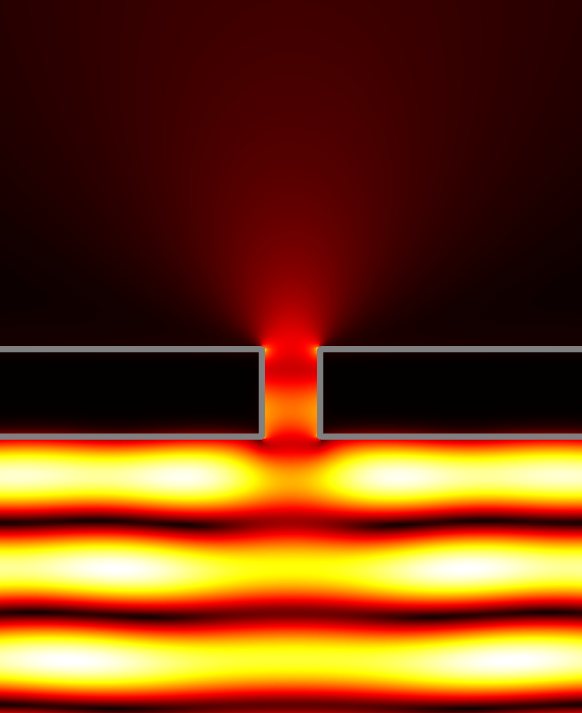
FDFD simulation of light diffraction from a plasmonic slit

The finite-difference frequency-domain (FDFD) method is a numerical solution method for problems usually in electromagnetism and sometimes in acoustics, based on finite-difference approximations of the derivative operators in the differential equation being solved.

While "FDFD" is a generic term describing all frequency-domain finite-difference methods, the title seems to mostly describe the method as applied to scattering problems. The method shares many similarities to the finite-difference time-domain (FDTD) method, so much so that the literature on FDTD can be directly applied. The method works by transforming Maxwell's equations (or other partial differential equation) for sources and fields at a constant frequency into matrix form $Ax = b$. The matrix A is derived from the wave equation operator, the column vector x contains the field components, and the column vector b describes the source. The method is capable of incorporating anisotropic materials, but off-diagonal components of the tensor require special treatment.

Strictly speaking, there are at least two categories of "frequency-domain" problems in electromagnetism. One is to find the response to a current density J with a constant frequency ω, i.e. of the form $\mathbf{J}(\mathbf{x}) e^{i\omega t}$, or a similar time-harmonic source. This frequency-domain response problem leads to an $Ax = b$ system of linear equations as described above. An early description of a frequency-domain response FDTD method to solve scattering problems was published by Christ and Hartnagel (1987). Another is to find the normal modes of a structure (e.g. a waveguide) in the absence of sources: in this case the frequency ω is itself a variable, and one obtains an eigenproblem $Ax = \lambda x$ (usually, the eigenvalue λ is ω^{2}). An early description of an FDTD method to solve electromagnetic eigenproblems was published by Albani and Bernardi (1974).

== Implementing the method ==
1. Use a Yee grid because it offers the following benefits: (1) it implicitly satisfies the zero divergence conditions to avoid spurious solutions, (2) it naturally handles physical boundary conditions, and (3) it provides a very elegant and compact way of approximating the curl equations with finite-differences.
2. Much of the literature on finite-difference time-domain (FDTD) methods applies to FDFD, particularly topics on how to represent materials and devices on a Yee grid.

== Comparison with FDTD and FEM ==
The FDFD method is very similar to the finite element method (FEM), although there are some major differences. Unlike the FDTD method, there are no time steps that must be computed sequentially, thus making FDFD easier to implement. This might also lead one to imagine that FDFD is less computationally expensive; however, this is not necessarily the case. The FDFD method requires solving a sparse linear system, which even for simple problems can be 20,000 by 20,000 elements or larger, with over a million unknowns. In this respect, the FDFD method is similar to the FEM, which is a finite differential method and is also usually implemented in the frequency domain. There are efficient numerical solvers available so that matrix inversion—an extremely computationally expensive process—can be avoided. Additionally, model order reduction techniques can be employed to reduce problem size.

FDFD, and FDTD for that matter, does not lend itself well to complex geometries or multiscale structures, as the Yee grid is restricted mostly to rectangular structures. This can be circumvented by either using a very fine grid mesh (which increases computational cost), or by approximating the effects with surface boundary conditions. Non uniform gridding can lead to spurious charges at the interface boundary, as the zero divergence conditions are not maintained when the grid is not uniform along an interface boundary. E and H field continuity can be maintained to circumvent this problem by enforcing weak continuity across the interface using basis functions, as is done in FEM. Perfectly matched layer (PML) boundary conditions can also be used to truncate the grid, and avoid meshing empty space.

== Susceptance element equivalent circuit ==
The FDFD equations can be rearranged in such a way as to describe a second order equivalent circuit, where nodal voltages represent the E field components and branch currents represent the H field components. This equivalent circuit representation can be extremely useful, as techniques from circuit theory can be used to analyze or simplify the problem and can be used as a spice-like tool for three-dimensional electromagnetic simulation. This susceptance element equivalent circuit (SEEC) model has the advantages of a reduced number of unknowns, only having to solve for E field components, and second order model order reduction techniques can be employed.

== Applications ==
The FDFD method has been used to provide full wave simulation for modeling interconnects for various applications in electronic packaging. FDFD has also been used for various scattering problems at optical frequencies.

== See also ==
- Finite-difference time-domain method
- Finite element method
