= Limiting absorption principle =

In mathematics, the limiting absorption principle (LAP) is a concept from operator theory and scattering theory that consists of choosing the "correct" resolvent of a linear operator at the essential spectrum based on the behavior of the resolvent near the essential spectrum. The term is often used to indicate that the resolvent, when considered not in the original space (which is usually the $L^2$ space), but in certain weighted spaces (usually $L^2_s$, see below), has a limit as the spectral parameter approaches the essential spectrum. This concept developed from the idea of introducing complex parameter into the Helmholtz equation $(\Delta+k^2)u(x)=-F(x)$ for selecting a particular solution. This idea is credited to Vladimir Ignatowski, who was considering the propagation and absorption of the electromagnetic waves in a wire. It is closely related to the Sommerfeld radiation condition and the limiting amplitude principle (1948). The terminology – both the limiting absorption principle and the limiting amplitude principle – was introduced by Aleksei Sveshnikov.

== Formulation ==
To find which solution to the Helmholz equation with nonzero right-hand side

$$\Delta v(x)+k^2 v(x)=-F(x),\quad x\in\R^3,$$

with some fixed $k>0$, corresponds to the outgoing waves, one considers the limit

$$v(x)=-\lim_{\epsilon\to +0} (\Delta+k^2-i\epsilon)^{-1}F(x).$$

The relation to absorption can be traced to the expression $E(t,x)=A e^{i(\omega t+\varkappa x)}$ for the electric field used by Ignatowsky: the absorption corresponds to nonzero imaginary part of $\varkappa$, and the equation satisfied by $E(t,x)$ is given by the Helmholtz equation (or reduced wave equation) $(\Delta+\varkappa^2/\omega^2)E(t,x)=0$, with

$$\varkappa^2=\frac{\mu\varepsilon\omega^2}{c^2}-i 4\pi\sigma\mu\omega$$

having negative imaginary part (and thus with $\varkappa^2/\omega^2$ no longer belonging to the spectrum of $-\Delta$). Above, $\mu$ is magnetic permeability, $\sigma$ is electric conductivity, $\varepsilon$ is dielectric constant, and $c$ is the speed of light in vacuum.

== Example and relation to the limiting amplitude principle ==
One can consider the Laplace operator in one dimension, which is an unbounded operator $A=-\partial_x^2,$ acting in $L^2(\R)$ and defined on the domain $D(A)=H^2(\R)$, the Sobolev space. Let us describe its resolvent, $R(z)=(A-z I)^{-1}$. Given the equation

$$(-\partial_x^2-z)u(x)=F(x),\quad x\in\R,\quad F\in L^2(\R)$$,

then, for the spectral parameter $z$ from the resolvent set $\Complex\setminus[0,+\infty)$, the solution $u\in L^2(\R)$ is given by $u(x)=(R(z)F)(x)=(G(\cdot,z)*F)(x),$ where $G(\cdot,z)*F$ is the convolution of F with the fundamental solution G:

$$(G(\cdot,z)*F)(x)=\int_\R G(x-y;z)F(y) \, dy,$$

where the fundamental solution is given by

$$G(x;z) = \frac{1}{2\sqrt{-z}} e^{-|x|\sqrt{-z}},
\quad
z \in \Complex\setminus[0,+\infty).$$

To obtain an operator bounded in $L^2(\R)$, one needs to use the branch of the square root which has positive real part (which decays for large absolute value of x), so that the convolution of G with $F\in L^2(\R)$ makes sense.

One can also consider the limit of the fundamental solution $G(x;z)$ as $z$ approaches the spectrum of $-\partial_x^2$, given by $\sigma(-\partial_x^2)=[0,+\infty)$. Assume that $z$ approaches $k^2$, with some $k>0$. Depending on whether $z$ approaches $k^2$ in the complex plane from above ($\Im (z)>0$) or from below ($\Im (z)<0$) of the real axis, there will be two different limiting expressions: $G_+(x;k^2)=\lim_{\varepsilon\to 0+}G(x;k^2+i\varepsilon)=-\frac{1}{2ik}e^{i|x|k}$ when $z\in\Complex$ approaches $k^2\in(0,+\infty)$ from above and $G_-(x;k^2)=\lim_{\varepsilon\to 0+}G(x;k^2-i\varepsilon)=\frac{1}{2ik}e^{-i|x|k}$ when $z$ approaches $k^2\in(0,+\infty)$ from below. The resolvent $R_+(k^2)$ (convolution with $G_+(x;k^2)$) corresponds to outgoing waves of the inhomogeneous Helmholtz equation $(-\partial_x^2-k^2)u(x)=F(x)$, while $R_-(k^2)$ corresponds to incoming waves. This is directly related to the limiting amplitude principle: to find which solution corresponds to the outgoing waves, one considers the inhomogeneous wave equation

$$(\partial_t^2-\partial_x^2)\psi(t,x)=F(x)e^{-i k t},\quad t\ge 0, \quad x\in\R,$$

with zero initial data $\psi(0,x)=0,\,\partial_t\psi(t,x)|_{t=0}=0$. A particular solution to the inhomogeneous Helmholtz equation corresponding to outgoing waves is obtained as the limit of $\psi(t,x)e^{i k t}$ for large times.

== Estimates in the weighted spaces ==
Let $A:\,X\to X$ be a linear operator in a Banach space $X$, defined on the domain $D(A)\subset X$. For the values of the spectral parameter from the resolvent set of the operator, $z\in\rho(A)\subset\Complex$, the resolvent $R(z)=(A-z I)^{-1}$ is bounded when considered as a linear operator acting from $X$ to itself, $R(z):\,X\to X$, but its bound depends on the spectral parameter $z$ and tends to infinity as $z$ approaches the spectrum of the operator, $\sigma(A)=\Complex\setminus\rho(A)$. More precisely, there is the relation

$$\Vert R(z)\Vert\ge\frac{1}{\operatorname{dist}(z,\sigma(A))}, \qquad z\in\rho(A).$$

Many scientists refer to the "limiting absorption principle" when they want to say that the resolvent $R(z)$ of a particular operator $A$, when considered as acting in certain weighted spaces, has a limit (and/or remains uniformly bounded) as the spectral parameter $z$ approaches the essential spectrum, $\sigma_{\mathrm{ess}}(A)$. For instance, in the above example of the Laplace operator in one dimension, $A=-\partial_x^2:\,L^2(\R)\to L^2(\R)$, defined on the domain $D(A)=H^2(\R)$, for $z>0$, both operators $R_\pm(z)$ with the integral kernels $G_\pm(x-y;z)$ are not bounded in $L^2$ (that is, as operators from $L^2$ to itself), but will both be uniformly bounded when considered as operators

$$R_\pm(z):\;L^2_s(\R)\to L^2_{-s}(\R),\quad s>1/2,\quad z\in\Complex\setminus[0,+\infty),\quad |z|\ge\delta,$$

with fixed $\delta>0$. The spaces $L^2_s(\R)$ are defined as spaces of locally integrable functions such that their $L^2_s$-norm,

$$\Vert u\Vert_{L^2_s(\R)}^2=\int_\R (1+x^2)^s|u(x)|^2 \, dx,$$

is finite.

== See also ==
- Sommerfeld radiation condition
- Limiting amplitude principle
