= Limiting amplitude principle =

Mathematical concept for solving the Helmholtz equation

In mathematics, the limiting amplitude principle is a concept from operator theory and scattering theory used for choosing a particular solution to the Helmholtz equation. The choice is made by considering a particular time-dependent problem of the forced oscillations due to the action of a periodic force. The principle was introduced by Andrey Nikolayevich Tikhonov and Alexander Andreevich Samarskii. It is closely related to the limiting absorption principle (1905) and the Sommerfeld radiation condition (1912). The terminology -- both the limiting absorption principle and the limiting amplitude principle -- was introduced by Aleksei Sveshnikov.

== Formulation ==
To find which solution to the Helmholz equation with nonzero right-hand side

$$\Delta v(x)+k^2 v(x)=-F(x),\quad x\in\R^3,$$

with some fixed $k>0$, corresponds to the outgoing waves, one considers the wave equation with the source term,

$$(\Delta-\partial_t^2)u(x,t)=-F(x)e^{-i k t},\quad t\ge 0, \quad x\in\R^3,$$

with zero initial data $u(x,0)=0,\,\partial_t u(x,0)=0$. A particular solution to the Helmholtz equation corresponding to outgoing waves is obtained as the limit

$$v(x)=\lim_{t\to +\infty}u(x,t)e^{i k t}$$

for large times.

== See also ==
- Limiting absorption principle
- Sommerfeld radiation condition
