= Acoustic wave equation =

Equation for the propagation of sound waves through a medium

In physics, the acoustic wave equation is a second-order partial differential equation that governs the propagation of acoustic waves through a material medium resp. a standing wavefield. The equation describes the evolution of acoustic pressure p or particle velocity u as a function of position x and time t. A simplified (scalar) form of the equation describes acoustic waves in only one spatial dimension, while a more general form describes waves in three dimensions.

For lossy media, more intricate models need to be applied in order to take into account frequency-dependent attenuation and phase speed. Such models include acoustic wave equations that incorporate fractional derivative terms, see also the acoustic attenuation article or the survey paper.

== Definition in one dimension ==
The wave equation describing a standing wave field in one dimension (position $x$) is

$$p_{xx} - \frac{1}{c^2} p_{tt} =0,$$

where $p$ is the acoustic pressure (the local deviation from the ambient pressure) and $c$ the speed of sound, using subscript notation for the partial derivatives.

=== Derivation ===
Start with the ideal gas law

$$P = \rho R_\text{specific}T,$$

where $T$ the absolute temperature of the gas and specific gas constant $R_\text{specific}$. Then, assuming the process is adiabatic, pressure $P(\rho)$ can be considered a function of density $\rho$.

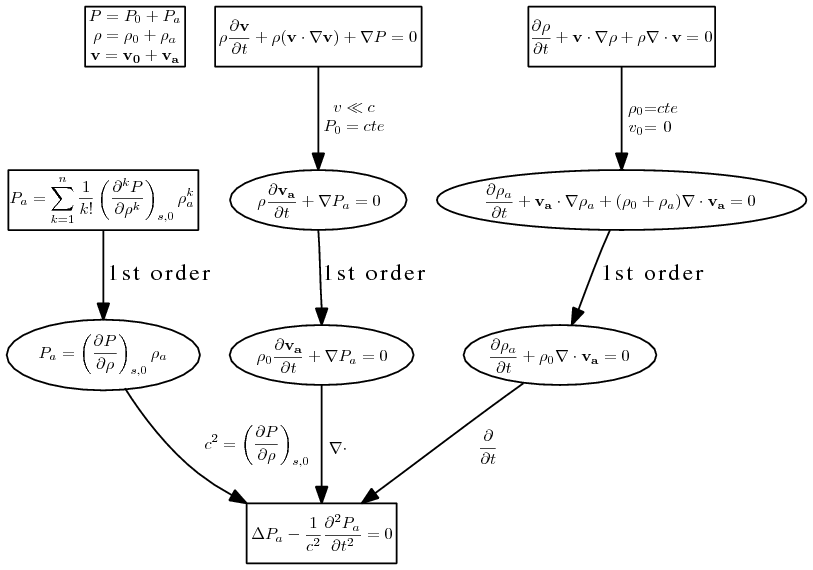
Derivation of the acoustic wave equation

The conservation of mass and conservation of momentum can be written as a closed system of two equations
$$\begin{align}
\rho_{t} + (\rho u)_{x} &= 0,\\
(\rho u)_{t} + (\rho u^2 + P(\rho))_{x} &=0.
\end{align}$$
This coupled system of two nonlinear conservation laws can be written in vector form as:
$$q_t + f(q)_x = 0,$$
with
$$q = \begin{bmatrix}\rho \\ \rho u\end{bmatrix} = \begin{bmatrix}q_{(1)} \\ q_{(2)}\end{bmatrix}, \quad f(q) = \begin{bmatrix}\rho u \\ \rho u^2 + P(\rho)\end{bmatrix}=\begin{bmatrix} q_{(2)} \\ q_{(2)}^2/q_{(1)} + P(q_{(1)})\end{bmatrix}.$$

To linearize this equation, let
$$q(x,t) = q_0 + \tilde{q}(x,t),$$
where $q_0 = ( \rho_0 , \rho_0 u_0)$ is the (constant) background state and $\tilde{q}$ is a sufficiently small perturbation, i.e., any powers or products of $\tilde{q}$ can be discarded. Hence, the Taylor expansion of $f(q)$ gives:
$$f(q_0 + \tilde{q}) \approx f(q_0) + f'(q_0)\tilde{q}$$
where
$$f'(q) = \begin{bmatrix} \partial f_{(1)}/\partial q_{(1)} &  \partial f_{(1)}/\partial q_{(2)}\\  \partial f_{(2)}/\partial q_{(1)} & \partial f_{(2)}/\partial q_{(2)} \end{bmatrix}=\begin{bmatrix} 0 & 1 \\ -u^2 + P'(\rho) & 2u\end{bmatrix}.$$
This results in the linearized equation
$$\tilde{q}_t + f'(q_0)\tilde{q}_x = 0 \quad \Leftrightarrow \quad \begin{align}
\tilde{\rho}_{t} + (\widetilde{\rho u})_{x} &= 0\\
(\widetilde{\rho u})_{t} + (-u_{0}^2 + P'(\rho_{0}))\tilde{\rho }_{x} + 2u_{0}(\widetilde{\rho u})_x &=0
\end{align}$$
Likewise, small perturbations of the components of $q$ can be rewritten as:
$$\rho u = (\rho_0 +\tilde{\rho})(u_0 +\tilde{u}) = \rho_0 u_0 + \tilde{\rho}u_0 + \rho_0 \tilde{u} + \tilde{\rho}\tilde{u}$$
such that
$$\widetilde{\rho u} \approx \tilde{\rho}u_0 + \rho_0 \tilde{u},$$
and pressure perturbations relate to density perturbations as:
$$p = p_{0} + \tilde{p}= P(\rho_0 + \tilde{\rho}) = P(\rho_{0}) + P'(\rho_{0})\tilde{\rho} + \dots$$
such that:
$$p_0 = P(\rho_0), \quad \tilde{p}\approx P'(\rho_0)\tilde{\rho},$$
where $P'(\rho_0)$ is a constant, resulting in the alternative form of the linear acoustics equations:
$$\begin{align}
\tilde{p}_{t} + u_0 \tilde{p}_x + K_0 \tilde{u}_x &= 0,\\
\rho_0\tilde{u}_t + \tilde{p}_x + \rho_0 u_0 \tilde{u}_x &=0.
\end{align}$$
where $K_0 = \rho_0 P'(\rho_0)$ is the bulk modulus of compressibility. After dropping the tilde for convenience, the linear first order system can be written as:
$$\begin{bmatrix}
p\\
u
\end{bmatrix}_{t} + \begin{bmatrix}
u_{0} & K_0\\
1/\rho_0 & u_0
\end{bmatrix}\begin{bmatrix}
p\\
u
\end{bmatrix}_{x}=0.$$
While, in general, a non-zero background velocity is possible (e.g. when studying the sound propagation in a constant-strength wind), it will be assumed that $u_{0}=0$. Then the linear system reduces to the second-order wave equation:
$$p_{tt} = -K_0 u_{xt} = -K_0 u_{tx} = K_0\left(\frac{1}{\rho_0}p_x\right)_x = c_{0}^2 p_{xx},$$
with $c_0 = \sqrt{K_0/\rho_0}$ the speed of sound.

Hence, the acoustic equation can be derived from a system of first-order advection equations that follow directly from physics, i.e., the first integrals:
$$q_t + Aq_x = 0,$$
with
$$q = \begin{bmatrix}p\\ u\end{bmatrix}, \quad A =  \begin{bmatrix}
0 & K_0\\
1/\rho_0 & 0
\end{bmatrix}.$$
Conversely, given the second-order equation $p_{tt} =c_{0}^2 p_{xx}$ a first-order system can be derived:
$$q_t + \hat{A}q_x = 0,$$
with
$$q = \begin{bmatrix}p_t\\ -p_x\end{bmatrix}, \quad \hat{A} =  \begin{bmatrix}
0 & c_{0}^2\\
1 & 0
\end{bmatrix},$$
where matrix $A$ and $\hat{A}$ are similar.

=== Solution ===
Provided that the speed $c$ is a constant, not dependent on frequency (the dispersionless case), then the most general solution is

$$p = f(c t - x) + g(c t + x)$$

where $f$ and $g$ are any two twice-differentiable functions. This may be pictured as the superposition of two waveforms of arbitrary profile, one ($f$) traveling up the x-axis and the other ($g$) down the x-axis at the speed $c$. The particular case of a sinusoidal wave traveling in one direction is obtained by choosing either $f$ or $g$ to be a sinusoid, and the other to be zero, giving

$$p=p_0 \sin(\omega t \mp kx)$$.

where $\omega$ is the angular frequency of the wave and $k$ is its wave number.

== In three dimensions ==
=== Equation ===
Feynman provides a derivation of the wave equation for sound in three dimensions as

$$\nabla ^2 p - {1 \over c^2} { \partial^2 p  \over  \partial t ^2 } = 0,$$

where $\nabla ^2$ is the Laplace operator, $p$ is the acoustic pressure (the local deviation from the ambient pressure), and $c$ is the speed of sound.

A similar looking wave equation but for the vector field particle velocity is given by

$$\nabla ^2 \mathbf{u}\; - {1 \over c^2} { \partial^2 \mathbf{u}\; \over  \partial t ^2 } = 0$$.

In some situations, it is more convenient to solve the wave equation for an abstract scalar field velocity potential which has the form

$$\nabla ^2 \Phi - {1 \over c^2} { \partial^2 \Phi  \over  \partial t ^2 } = 0$$

and then derive the physical quantities particle velocity and acoustic pressure by the equations (or definition, in the case of particle velocity):

$$\mathbf{u} = \nabla \Phi\;$$,
$$p = -\rho {\partial \over \partial t}\Phi$$.

=== Solution ===
The following solutions are obtained by separation of variables in different coordinate systems. They are phasor solutions, that is they have an implicit time-dependence factor of $e^{i\omega t}$ where $\omega = 2 \pi f$ is the angular frequency. The explicit time dependence is given by

$$p(r,t,k) = \operatorname{Real}\left[p(r,k) e^{i\omega t}\right]$$

Here $k = \omega/c \$ is the wave number.

==== Cartesian coordinates ====
$$p(r,k)=Ae^{\pm ikr}$$.

==== Cylindrical coordinates ====
$$p(r,k)=AH_0^{(1)}(kr) + \ BH_0^{(2)}(kr)$$.

where the asymptotic approximations to the Hankel functions, when $kr\rightarrow \infty$, are

$$H_0^{(1)}(kr) \simeq \sqrt{\frac{2}{\pi kr}}e^{i(kr-\pi/4)}$$

$$H_0^{(2)}(kr) \simeq \sqrt{\frac{2}{\pi kr}}e^{-i(kr-\pi/4)}$$.

==== Spherical coordinates ====
$$p(r,k)=\frac{A}{r}e^{\pm ikr}$$.

Depending on the chosen Fourier convention, one of these represents an outward travelling wave and the other a nonphysical inward travelling wave. The inward travelling solution wave is only nonphysical because of the singularity that occurs at r=0; inward travelling waves do exist.

== See also ==
- Acoustics
- Acoustic attenuation
- Acoustic theory
- Differential equations
- Fluid dynamics
- Ideal gas law
- Madelung equations
- One-way wave equation
- Pressure
- Thermodynamics
- Wave equation
