= Duct modes =

The acoustic pressure in a cylindrical duct can be expressed as the superposition of duct modes:

$$p = \sum \alpha_i \phi_i$$

where $\alpha_i$ is the participation factor or modal amplitude and $\phi_i$ is the mode shape. The duct mode shape are analytically determined from the solution of the Helmholtz equation.
