= Leslie Stephen George Kovasznay =

Hungarian-American engineer

Leslie S. G. Kovasznay (14 April 1918, Budapest – 17 April 1980) was a Hungarian-American engineer, known as one of the world's leading experts in turbulent flow research.

Kovasznay earned in 1943 his doctorate in engineering at the Royal Hungarian Institute of Technology in the laboratory of Előd Abody-Anderlik in the faculty of mechanical engineering. After working from 1941 to 1946 at that Faculty, he spent a year at the Cavendish Laboratory working with Sir Geoffrey Taylor. From 1947 to 1978 Kovasznay was a faculty member of the Aeronautics Department organized by Francis H. Clauser (1913–2013) at Johns Hopkins University (JHU). In December, he resigned from JHU to become a professor of mechanical engineering at the University of Houston, where he remained in his professorship until his sudden death in 1980.

... at Johns Hopkins he developed the first basic procedures for hot-wire anemometers in supersonic flows, procedures still in use. He was also one of the first to apply the statistical "information theory" of Claude Shannon to photographic measurements, treating the film graininess as the noise.

In the 1970s, he worked with Hajime Fujita on experimental studies of interactions between airfoils and wake turbulence and, with Chih-Ming Ho, on experimental studies of interactions between sound and turbulence.

Kovasznay's theoretical fluid dynamic contributions to turbulence began with the simplest plausible turbulence spectrum, and included categorization of gas dynamic fluctuations into vorticity, sound, and entropy "modes", and the analysis of the lowest order nonlinear interactions (with B. T. Chu). After work on laminar instability (with W. O. Criminale) and magneto-fluid dynamic fluctuations (with M. M. Stanisic), he introduced a practical turbulent shear equation closure model with (V. Nee). That was followed by partially deterministic turbulence models (with R. Lee and R. Takaki).

He travelled widely, lectured at many universities and conferences, and made extended visits in France and Japan. He was the author or coauthor of more than 80 papers. He was a Guggenheim Fellow for the academic year 1955–1956. He was elected a Fellow of the American Physical Society in 1962.

Kovasznay married in 1944. Upon his death, he was survived by his widow and their daughter.

== Selected publications ==
- Kovasznay, Leslie S. G. (1948). "Spectrum of Locally Isotropic Turbulence". Journal of the Aeronautical Sciences. 15 (12): 745–753. doi:10.2514/8.11707.
- Kovasznay, L. I. G.; Taylor, Geoffrey (1948). "Laminar flow behind a two-dimensional grid". Mathematical Proceedings of the Cambridge Philosophical Society. 44 (1): 58–62. Bibcode:1948PCPS...44...58K. doi:10.1017/S0305004100023999. S2CID 121460326.
- Kovasznay, L. S. G. (1949). "Hot-wire investigation of the wake behind cylinders at low Reynolds numbers". Proceedings of the Royal Society of London. Series A. Mathematical and Physical Sciences. 198 (1053): 174–190. Bibcode:1949RSPSA.198..174K. doi:10.1098/rspa.1949.0093.
- Kovasznay, Leslie S. G. (1950). "The Hot-Wire Anemometer in Supersonic Flow". Journal of the Aeronautical Sciences. 17 (9): 565–572. doi:10.2514/8.1725.
- Kovasznay, Leslie S. G. (1953). "Turbulence in Supersonic Flow". Journal of the Aeronautical Sciences. 20 (10): 657–674. doi:10.2514/8.2793.
- Uberoi, Mahinder S.; Kovasznay, Leslie S. G. (1953). "On Mapping and Measurement of Random Fields". Quarterly of Applied Mathematics. 10 (4): 375–393. doi:10.1090/qam/51466. JSTOR 43633985.
- Kovasznay, L.; Joseph, H. (1955). "Image Processing". Proceedings of the IRE. 43 (5): 560–570. doi:10.1109/JRPROC.1955.278100.
- Chu, Boa-Teh; Kovásznay, Leslie S. G. (1958). "Non-linear interactions in a viscous heat-conducting compressible gas". Journal of Fluid Mechanics. 3 (5): 494. doi:10.1017/S0022112058000148. S2CID 121771565.
- Fujita, Hajime; Kovasznay, Leslie S. G. (1968). "Measurement of Reynolds Stress by a Single Rotated Hot Wire Anemometer". Review of Scientific Instruments. 39 (9): 1351–1355. Bibcode:1968RScI...39.1351F. doi:10.1063/1.1683670.
- Chevray, Rene; Kovasznay, Leslie S. G. (1969). "Turbulence measurements in the wake of a thin flat plate". AIAA Journal. 7 (8): 1641–1643. Bibcode:1969AIAAJ...7.1641C. doi:10.2514/3.5461.
- Nee, Victor W.; Kovasznay, Leslie S. G. (1969). "Simple Phenomenological Theory of Turbulent Shear Flows". Physics of Fluids. 12 (3): 473. Bibcode:1969PhFl...12..473N. doi:10.1063/1.1692510.
- Kovasznay, Leslie S. G.; Kibens, Valdis; Blackwelder, Ron F. (1970). "Large-scale motion in the intermittent region of a turbulent boundary layer". Journal of Fluid Mechanics. 41 (2): 283–325. Bibcode:1970JFM....41..283K. doi:10.1017/S0022112070000629. S2CID 56352032.
- Blackwelder, Ron F.; Kovasznay, Leslie S. G. (1972). "Large-scale motion of a turbulent boundary layer during relaminarization". Journal of Fluid Mechanics. 53: 61–83. Bibcode:1972JFM....53...61B. doi:10.1017/S0022112072000047. S2CID 122754426.
- Blackwelder, Ron F.; Kovasznay, Leslie S. G. (1972). "Time Scales and Correlations in a Turbulent Boundary Layer". Physics of Fluids. 15 (9): 1545. Bibcode:1972PhFl...15.1545B. doi:10.1063/1.1694128.

== See also ==
- Kovasznay flow
- Entropy-vorticity wave
