= Entropy-vorticity wave =

Entropy-vorticity waves (or sometimes entropy-vortex waves) refer to small-amplitude waves carried by the gas within which entropy, vorticity, density but not pressure perturbations are propagated. Entropy-vortivity waves are essentially isobaric, incompressible, rotational perturbations along with entropy perturbations. This wave differs from the other well-known small-amplitude wave that is a sound wave, which propagates with respect to the gas within which density, pressure but not entropy perturbations are propagated. The classification of small disturbances into acoustic, entropy and vortex modes were introduced by Leslie S. G. Kovasznay.

Entropy-vorticity waves are ubiquitous in supersonic problems, particularly those involving shock waves. Since these perturbations are carried by the gas, they are convected by the flow downstream of the shock wave, but they cannot be propagates in the upstream direction (behind the shock wave) unlike the acoustic wave, which can propagate upstream and can catch up the shock wave. As such, they are useful in understanding many highspeed flows and are important in many applications such as in solid-propellant rockets and detonations.

== Mathematical description ==
Consider a gas flow with a uniform velocity field $\mathbf v$ and having a pressure $p$, density $\rho$, entropy $s$ and sound speed $c$. Now we add small perturbations to these variables, which are denoted with a symbol $\delta$. The perturbed variables being small quantities satisfy linearized form of the Euler equations, which is given by

$$\begin{align}
\frac{\partial\delta p}{\partial t} + \mathbf v\cdot \nabla \delta p + \rho c^2 \nabla\cdot \delta\mathbf v &= 0,\\
\frac{\partial\delta\mathbf v}{\partial t} + (\mathbf v\cdot \nabla)\delta\mathbf v + \frac{1}{\rho}\nabla\delta p &=0,\\
\frac{\partial\delta s}{\partial t} + \mathbf v\cdot \nabla \delta s &=0,
\end{align}$$

where in the continuity equation, we have used the relation $\delta\rho = \delta p/c^2+(\partial \rho/\partial s)_p \delta s$ (since $\rho=\rho(p,s)$ and $c^2=(\partial p/\partial \rho)_s$) and the used the entropy equation to simplify it. Taking perturbations to be of the plane-wave form $e^{i\mathbf k\cdot \mathbf r-i\omega t}$, the linearised equations can be reduced to algebraic equations

$$\begin{align}
(\mathbf v\cdot\mathbf k-\omega)\delta p + \rho c^2 \mathbf k\cdot\delta\mathbf v&=0,\\
(\mathbf v\cdot\mathbf k-\omega)\delta\mathbf v +\mathbf k\delta p/\rho &=0,\\
(\mathbf v\cdot\mathbf k-\omega)\delta s &=0.
\end{align}$$

The last equation shows that either $\delta s=0$, which corresponds to sound waves in which entropy does not change or $\mathbf v\cdot\mathbf k-\omega=0$. The later condition indicating that perturbations are carried by the gas corresponds to the entropy-vortex wave. In this case, we have

$$\omega = \mathbf v\cdot\mathbf k, \quad \delta s\neq 0, \quad \delta p =0, \quad \delta \rho = \left(\frac{\partial \rho}{\partial s}\right)_p \delta s, \quad \mathbf k\cdot\delta\mathbf v=0, \quad \delta\boldsymbol\omega=i\mathbf k\times\delta \mathbf v\neq 0,$$

where $\delta\boldsymbol\omega=\nabla\times\delta\mathbf v$ is the vorticity perturbation. As we can see, the entropy perturbation $\delta s$ and the vorticity perturbation $\delta\boldsymbol\omega$ are independent meaning that one can have entropy waves without vorticity waves or vorticity waves with entropy waves or both entropy and vorticity waves.

In non-reacting multicomponent gas, we can also have compositional perturbations since in this case, $\rho=\rho(p,s,Y_i)$, where $Y_i$ is the mass fraction of ith species of total $N$ chemical species. In the entropy-vorticity wave, we have then

$$\delta\rho = \left(\frac{\partial \rho}{\partial s}\right)_{p,Y_i} \delta s + \sum_{i=1}^N \left(\frac{\partial \rho}{\partial Y_i}\right)_{s,p,Y_j(j\neq i)} \delta Y_i.$$
