= Kovasznay flow =

Exact solution of Navier–Stokes

Normalized streamline ($\psi/LU$) contours of the Kovasznay flow for $Re=50$. Color contours denote normalized vorticity $\omega L/U$.

Kovasznay flow corresponds to an exact solution of the Navier–Stokes equations and are interpreted to describe the flow behind a two-dimensional grid. The flow is named after Leslie Stephen George Kovasznay, who discovered this solution in 1948. The solution is often used to validate numerical codes solving two-dimensional Navier-Stokes equations.

== Flow description ==
Let $U$ be the free stream velocity and let $L$ be the spacing between a two-dimensional grid. The velocity field $(u,v,0)$ of the Kovaszany flow, expressed in the Cartesian coordinate system is given by

$$\frac{u}{U} = 1- e^{\lambda x/L}\cos\left(\frac{2\pi y}{L}\right), \quad \frac{v}{U} = \frac{\lambda}{2\pi} e^{\lambda x/L}\sin\left(\frac{2\pi y}{L}\right)$$

where $\lambda$ is the root of the equation $\lambda^2-Re\, \lambda -4\pi^2=0$ in which $Re=UL/\nu$ represents the Reynolds number of the flow. The root that describes the flow behind the two-dimensional grid is found to be

$$\lambda = \frac{1}{2}(Re-\sqrt{Re^2+16\pi^2}).$$

The corresponding vorticity field $(0,0,\omega)$ and the stream function $\psi$ are given by

$$\frac{\omega}{U/L}=Re\lambda e^{\lambda x/L}\sin\left(\frac{2\pi y}{L}\right), \quad \frac{\psi}{LU} = \frac{y}{L}- \frac{1}{2\pi}e^{\lambda x/L}\sin\left(\frac{2\pi y}{L}\right).$$

Similar exact solutions, extending Kovasznay's, has been noted by Lin and Tobak and C. Y. Wang.

== See Also ==
- Taylor–Green vortex – another exact solution of the Navier–Stokes equations used to test numerical solvers
- Lid-driven cavity – another flow commonly used to test solvers of the two-dimensional Navier–Stokes equations
