= Sommerfeld radiation condition =

Radiation boundary condition

In applied mathematics, and theoretical physics, the Sommerfeld radiation condition is a concept from theory of differential equations and scattering theory used for choosing a particular solution to the Helmholtz equation. It was introduced by Arnold Sommerfeld in 1912 and is closely related to the limiting absorption principle (1905) and the limiting amplitude principle (1948).

The boundary condition established by the principle essentially chooses a solution of some wave equations which only radiates outwards from known sources, disallowing arbitrary inbound waves propagating in from infinity.

The theorem most underpinned by the condition only holds true in three spatial dimensions, in which the power of a wave is inversely proportional to the square of the radial distance. This is not the case in two dimensions. On the other hand, in four or more spatial dimensions, power in wave motion falls off much faster in distance.

== Formulation ==
Arnold Sommerfeld defined the condition of radiation for a scalar field satisfying the Helmholtz equation as

"the sources must be sources, not sinks of energy. The energy which is radiated from the sources must scatter to infinity; no energy may be radiated from infinity into ... the field."

Mathematically, consider the inhomogeneous Helmholtz equation

$$(\nabla^2 + k^2) u = -f \text{ in } \mathbb R^n$$

where $n=2, 3$ is the dimension of the space, $f$ is a given function with compact support representing a bounded source of energy, and $k>0$ is a constant, called the wave number. A solution $u$ to this equation is called radiating if it satisfies the Sommerfeld radiation condition

$$\lim_{|x| \to \infty} |x|^{\frac{n-1}{2}} \left( \frac{\partial}{\partial |x|} - ik \right) u(x) = 0$$

uniformly in all directions

$$\hat{x} = \frac{x}{|x|}$$

(above, $i$ is the imaginary unit and $|\cdot|$ is the Euclidean norm). Here, it is assumed that the time-harmonic field is $e^{-i\omega t}u.$ If the time-harmonic field is instead $e^{i\omega t}u,$ one should replace $-i$ with $+i$ in the Sommerfeld radiation condition.

The Sommerfeld radiation condition is used to solve uniquely the Helmholtz equation. For example, consider the problem of radiation due to a point source $x_0$ in three dimensions, so the function $f$ in the Helmholtz equation is $f(x)=\delta(x-x_0),$ where $\delta$ is the Dirac delta function. This problem has an infinite number of solutions, for example, any function of the form

$$u = cu_+ + (1-c) u_- \,$$

where $c$ is a constant, and

$$u_{\pm}(x) = \frac{e^{\pm ik|x-x_0|}}{4\pi |x-x_0|}.$$

Of all these solutions, only $u_+$ satisfies the Sommerfeld radiation condition and corresponds to a field radiating from $x_0.$ The other solutions are unphysical. For example, $u_{-}$ can be interpreted as energy coming from infinity and sinking at $x_0.$

== See also ==
- Limiting absorption principle
- Limiting amplitude principle
- Nonradiation condition
