= One-way wave equation =

Differential equation important in physics

A one-way wave equation is a first-order partial differential equation describing one wave traveling in a direction defined by the vector wave velocity. It contrasts with the second-order two-way wave equation describing a standing wavefield resulting from superposition of two waves in opposite directions (using the squared scalar wave velocity). In the one-dimensional case it is also known as a transport equation, and it allows wave propagation to be calculated without the mathematical complication of solving a 2nd order differential equation. Due to the fact that in the last decades no general solution to the 3D one-way wave equation could be found, numerous approximation methods based on the 1D one-way wave equation are used for 3D seismic and other geophysical calculations, see also the section § Three-dimensional case.

== One-dimensional case ==
The scalar second-order (two-way) wave equation describing a standing wavefield can be written as:
$$\frac{\partial^2 s}{\partial t^2} - c^2 \frac{\partial^2 s}{\partial x^2} = 0,$$
where $x$ is the coordinate, $t$ is time, $s=s(x,t)$ is the displacement, and $c$ is the wave velocity.

Due to the ambiguity in the direction of the wave velocity, $c^2=(+c)^2=(-c)^2$, the equation does not contain information about the wave direction and therefore has solutions propagating in both the forward ($+x$) and backward ($-x$) directions. The general solution of the equation is the summation of the solutions in these two directions:
$$s(x,t)=s_{+}(t -x/c) + s_{-} (t +x/c)$$

where $s_{+}$ and $s_{-}$ are the displacement amplitudes of the waves running in $+c$ and $-c$ direction.

When a one-way wave problem is formulated, the wave propagation direction has to be (manually) selected by keeping one of the two terms in the general solution.

Factoring the operator on the left side of the equation yields a pair of one-way wave equations, one with solutions that propagate forwards and the other with solutions that propagate backwards.

$$\left({\partial^2\over\partial t^2}-c^2{\partial^2\over\partial x^2}\right)s=
\left({\partial\over\partial t}-c{\partial\over\partial x}\right)
\left({\partial\over\partial t}+c{\partial\over\partial x}\right)s=0,$$

The backward- and forward-travelling waves are described respectively (for $c > 0$),
$$\begin{align}
& {\frac{\partial s}{\partial t} - c \frac{\partial s}{\partial x} = 0} \\[6pt]
& {\frac{\partial s}{\partial t} + c \frac{\partial s}{\partial x} = 0}
\end{align}$$

The one-way wave equations can also be physically derived directly from specific acoustic impedance.

In a longitudinal plane wave, the specific impedance determines the local proportionality of pressure $p= p(x,t)$ and particle velocity $v= v(x,t)$:

$$\frac{p}{v}=\rho c ,$$
with $\rho$ = density.

The conversion of the impedance equation leads to:

$$v - \frac{1}{\rho c} p  = 0$$	⁎

A longitudinal plane wave of angular frequency $\omega$ has the displacement $s = s(x,t)$.

The pressure $p$ and the particle velocity $v$ can be expressed in terms of the displacement $s$ ($E$: Elastic Modulus):

$$p:=E {\partial s\over\partial x}$$
for the 1D case this is in full analogy to stress $\sigma$ in mechanics: $\sigma = E \varepsilon$, with strain being defined as $\varepsilon = \frac{\Delta L}{L}$
$$v = {\partial s \over\partial t}$$

These relations inserted into the equation above (⁎) yield:

$${\partial s \over\partial t} - {E\over \rho c}  {\partial s\over\partial x} = 0$$

With the local wave velocity definition (speed of sound):

$$c=\sqrt{E(x) \over \rho(x)}   \Leftrightarrow  c = {E\over \rho c}$$

directly(!) follows the 1st-order partial differential equation of the one-way wave equation:

$${\frac{\partial s}{\partial t}-c \frac{\partial s}{\partial x} = 0}$$

The wave velocity $c$ can be set within this wave equation as $+c$ or $-c$ according to the direction of wave propagation.

For wave propagation in the direction of $+c$ the unique solution is

$$s(x,t)=s_{+}(t -x/c)$$

and for wave propagation in the $-c$ direction the respective solution is
$$s(x,t)=s_{-}(t+x/c)$$

There also exists a spherical one-way wave equation describing the wave propagation of a monopole sound source in spherical coordinates, i.e., in radial direction. By a modification of the radial nabla operator an inconsistency between spherical divergence and Laplace operators is solved and the resulting solution does not show Bessel functions (in contrast to the known solution of the conventional two-way approach).

== Three-dimensional case ==
The one-way equation and solution in the three-dimensional case was assumed to be similar way as for the one-dimensional case by a mathematical decomposition (factorization) of a 2nd order differential equation. In fact, the 3D one-way wave equation can be derived from first principles:

- derivation from impedance theorem and
- derivation from a tensorial impulse flow equilibrium in a field point.

It is also possible to derive the vectorial two-way wave operator from synthesis of two one-way wave operators (using a combined field variable). This approach shows that the two-way wave equation or two-way wave operator can be used for the specific condition $\nabla \mathbf c=0$, i.e. for homogeneous and anisotropic medium, whereas the one-way wave equation resp. one-way wave operator is also valid in inhomogeneous media.

== Inhomogeneous media ==
For inhomogeneous media with location-dependent elasticity module $E(x)$, density $\rho(x)$ and wave velocity $c(x)$ an analytical solution of the one-way wave equation can be derived by introduction of a new field variable.

== Further mechanical and electromagnetic waves ==
The method of PDE factorization can also be transferred to other 2nd or 4th order wave equations, e.g. transversal, and string, Moens/Korteweg, bending, and electromagnetic wave equations and electromagnetic waves.

== See also ==
- Wave equation – Differential equation for the description of waves or standing wave
- Standing wave – Wave that remains in a constant position
- Continuity equation – Equation describing the transport of some quantity
- Engquist–Majda absorbing boundary condition – Absorbing boundary condition for wave problems
