= Helmholtz equation =

Eigenvalue problem for the Laplace operator

In mathematics, the Helmholtz equation is the eigenvalue problem for the Laplace operator. It corresponds to the elliptic partial differential equation:
$$\nabla^2 f = -k^2 f,$$
where ∇^{2} is the Laplace operator, –k^{2} is the eigenvalue, and f is the (eigen)function. When the equation is applied to waves, k is known as the wave number. The Helmholtz equation has a variety of applications in physics and other sciences, including the wave equation, the diffusion equation, and the Schrödinger equation for a free particle.

In optics, the Helmholtz equation is the wave equation for the electric field.

The equation is named after Hermann von Helmholtz, who studied it in 1860.

== Motivation and uses ==
The Helmholtz equation often arises in the study of physical problems involving partial differential equations (PDEs) in both space and time. The Helmholtz equation, which represents a time-independent form of the wave equation, results from applying the technique of separation of variables to reduce the complexity of the analysis.

For example, consider the wave equation
$$\left(\nabla^2-\frac{1}{c^2}\frac{\partial^2}{\partial t^2}\right) u(\mathbf{r},t)=0.$$

Separation of variables begins by assuming that the wave function u(r, t) is in fact separable:
$$u(\mathbf{r},t) =A (\mathbf{r}) T(t).$$

Substituting this form into the wave equation and then simplifying, we obtain the following equation:
$$\frac{\nabla^2 A}{A} = \frac{1}{c^2 T} \frac{\mathrm{d}^2 T}{\mathrm{d} t^2}.$$

Notice that the expression on the left side depends only on r, whereas the right expression depends only on t. As a result, this equation is valid in the general case if and only if both sides of the equation are equal to the same constant value. This argument is key in the technique of solving linear partial differential equations by separation of variables. From this observation, we obtain two equations, one for A(r), the other for T(t):
$$\frac{\nabla^2 A}{A} = -k^2$$
$$\frac{1}{c^2 T} \frac{\mathrm{d}^2 T}{\mathrm{d}t^2} = -k^2,$$

where we have chosen, without loss of generality, the expression −k^{2} for the value of the constant. (It is equally valid to use any constant k as the separation constant; −k^{2} is chosen only for convenience in the resulting solutions.)

Rearranging the first equation, we obtain the (homogeneous) Helmholtz equation:
$$\nabla^2 A + k^2 A = (\nabla^2 + k^2) A = 0.$$

Likewise, after making the substitution ω = kc, where k is the wave number, and ω is the angular frequency (assuming a monochromatic field), the second equation becomes

$$\frac{\mathrm{d}^2 T}{\mathrm{d}t^2} + \omega^2T = \left( \frac{\mathrm{d}^2}{\mathrm{d}t^2} + \omega^2 \right) T = 0.$$

We now have Helmholtz's equation for the spatial variable r and a second-order ordinary differential equation in time. The solution in time will be a linear combination of sine and cosine functions, whose exact form is determined by initial conditions, while the form of the solution in space will depend on the boundary conditions. Alternatively, integral transforms, such as the Laplace or Fourier transform, are often used to transform a hyperbolic PDE into a form of the Helmholtz equation.

Because of its relationship to the wave equation, the Helmholtz equation arises in problems in such areas of physics as the study of electromagnetic radiation, seismology, and acoustics.

== Solving the Helmholtz equation using separation of variables ==
The solution to the spatial Helmholtz equation:
$$\nabla^2 A = -k^2 A$$
can be obtained for simple geometries using separation of variables.

=== Vibrating membrane ===
The two-dimensional analogue of the vibrating string is the vibrating membrane, with the edges clamped to be motionless. The Helmholtz equation was solved for many basic shapes in the 19th century: the rectangular membrane by Siméon Denis Poisson in 1829, the equilateral triangle by Gabriel Lamé in 1852, and the circular membrane by Alfred Clebsch in 1862. The elliptical drumhead was studied by Émile Mathieu, leading to Mathieu's differential equation.

If the edges of a shape are straight line segments, then a solution is integrable or knowable in closed-form only if it is expressible as a finite linear combination of plane waves that satisfy the boundary conditions (zero at the boundary, i.e., membrane clamped).

If the domain is a circle of radius a, then it is appropriate to introduce polar coordinates r and θ. The Helmholtz equation takes the form
$$\frac{\partial^2 A}{\partial r^2} + \frac{1}{r} \frac{\partial A}{\partial r} + \frac{1}{r^2} \frac{\partial^2 A}{\partial\theta^2} + k^2 A = 0\, .$$

We may impose the boundary condition that A vanishes if r = a; thus
$$A(a,\theta) = 0 \,.$$

the method of separation of variables leads to trial solutions of the form
$$A(r,\theta) = R(r)\, \Theta(\theta)\, ,$$
where Θ must be periodic of period 2π. This leads to

$$\Theta'' + n^2 \Theta = 0 ,$$
$$r^2 R'' + r R' + r^2 k^2 R - n^2 R = 0 ;$$
where $\frac{dR(r)}{dr} \equiv R'(r)\, ,$ and $\frac{d\Theta(\theta) }{d\theta} \equiv\Theta'(\theta)\, ,$ and so on are also equivalent notations.

It follows from the periodicity condition that
$$\Theta = \alpha \cos(n \theta) + \beta \sin(n \theta)\, ,$$
and that n must be an integer. The radial component R has the form
$$R = \gamma\, J_n(\rho)\, ,$$
where the Bessel function J_{n}(ρ) satisfies Bessel's equation
$$z^2 J_n'' + z\, J_n' + (z^2 - n^2)\, J_n = 0\, ,$$
and z = k r. The radial function J_{n} has infinitely many roots for each value of n, denoted by ρ_{m,n}. The boundary condition that A vanishes where r = a will be satisfied if the corresponding wavenumbers are given by
$$k_{m,n} = \frac{1}{a}\, \rho_{m,n} \,.$$

The general solution A then takes the form of a generalized Fourier series of terms involving products of J_{n}(k_{m,n}r) and the sine (or cosine) of n θ. These solutions are the modes of vibration of a circular drumhead.

=== Three-dimensional solutions ===
In spherical coordinates, the solution is:

$$A( r, \theta, \varphi ) = \sum_{\ell=0}^\infty \sum_{m=-\ell}^{+\ell} \left[ a_{\ell m}\, j_\ell( k r ) + b_{\ell m}\, y_\ell(kr) \right] Y^m_\ell(\theta,\varphi) ~.$$

This solution arises from the spatial solution of the wave equation and diffusion equation. Here j_{ℓ}(kr) and y_{ℓ}(kr) are the spherical Bessel functions, and Y^{m}_{ℓ}(θ, φ) are the spherical harmonics. Note that these forms are general solutions, and require boundary conditions to be specified to be used in any specific case. For infinite exterior domains, a radiation condition may also be required.

Writing r_{0} = (x, y, z) function A(r_{0}) has asymptotics
$$A(r_0) ~\longrightarrow~ \frac{ e^{i k r_0} }{ r_0 }\, f\left(\frac{ \mathbf{r}_0 }{ r_0 }, k, u_0 \right) ~+~ o\left(\frac 1 {r_0}\right) \quad \text{ as }~ r_0 \to \infty$$

where function f is called scattering amplitude and u_{0}(r_{0}) is the value of A at each boundary point r_{0}.

==== Three-dimensional solutions given the function on a 2-dimensional plane ====
Given a 2-dimensional plane where A is known, the solution to the Helmholtz equation is given by:
$$A(x, y, z) = -\frac{ 1 }{ 2\pi } \iint_{-\infty}^{+\infty} A'(x', y')\, \frac{ e^{i k r} }{ r } \, \frac{ z }{ r } \left(i k - \frac{1}{r} \right) dx'\, dy'\, ,$$

where

- $A'(x', y')$ is the solution at the 2-dimensional plane,
- $r = \sqrt{ (x - x')^2 + (y - y')^2 + z^2 }\, ,$

As z approaches zero, all contributions from the integral vanish except for r = 0. Thus $A(x, y, 0) = A'(x,y)$ up to a numerical factor, which can be verified to be 1 by transforming the integral to polar coordinates $\left( \rho, \theta \right) .$

This solution is important in diffraction theory, e.g. in deriving Fresnel diffraction.

== Paraxial approximation ==
In the paraxial approximation of the Helmholtz equation, the complex amplitude A is expressed as
$$A(\mathbf{r}) = u(\mathbf{r})\, e^{ikz}$$
where u represents the complex-valued amplitude which modulates the sinusoidal plane wave represented by the exponential factor. Then under a suitable assumption, u approximately solves
$$\nabla_{\perp}^2 u + 2ik\, \frac{ \partial u }{ \partial z } \approx 0\, ,$$
where $\nabla_\perp^2 \equiv \frac{ \partial^2 }{ \partial x^2 } + \frac{ \partial^2 }{ \partial y^2 }$ is the two dimensional ( x, y ) transverse part of the Laplacian.

This equation has important applications in the science of optics, where it provides solutions that describe the propagation of electromagnetic waves (light) in the form of either paraboloidal waves or Gaussian beams. Most lasers emit beams that take this form.

The assumption under which the paraxial approximation is valid is that the z derivative of the amplitude function u is a slowly varying function of z:

$$\left| \frac{ \partial^2 u }{ \partial z^2 } \right|\ \ll\ \left| k \ \frac{ \partial u }{ \partial z } \right| .$$

This condition is equivalent to saying that the angle θ between the wave vector k and the optical axis z is small: θ ≪ 1.

The paraxial form of the Helmholtz equation is found by substituting the above-stated expression for the complex amplitude into the general form of the Helmholtz equation as follows:

$$\nabla^{2}\Bigl(u\!\left( x,y,z \right) e^{ikz}\Bigr) + k^2 u\!\left( x,y,z \right) e^{ikz} = 0 ~.$$

Expansion and cancellation yields the following:

$$\left( \frac {\partial^2}{\partial x^2} + \frac{\partial^2}{\partial y^2} \right) u(x,y,z)\, e^{ikz} + \left( \frac{\partial^2}{\partial z^2}\, u(x,y,z) \right) e^{ikz} + 2 \left( \frac{ \partial }{\partial z} u(x,y,z) \right) ik \, {e^{ikz}} = 0 ~.$$

Because of the paraxial inequality stated above, we can choose to neglect the ∂^{2}u/∂z^{2} term as compared to the much larger k ∂u/∂z term. Dropping the smaller term produces the paraxial Helmholtz equation. Substituting u(r) = A(r) e^{−ikz} then gives the paraxial equation for the original complex amplitude A:

$$\nabla_{\perp}^2 A + 2ik\, \frac{ \partial A }{ \partial z } + 2k^2 A = 0 \,.$$

The Fresnel diffraction integral is an exact solution to the paraxial Helmholtz equation.

== Inhomogeneous Helmholtz equation ==
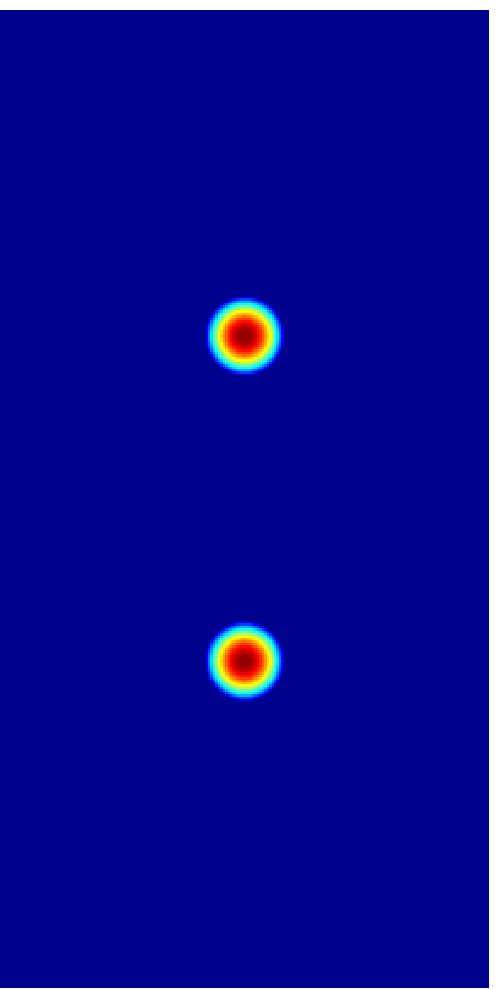
Two sources of radiation in the plane, given mathematically by a function f, which is zero in the blue region

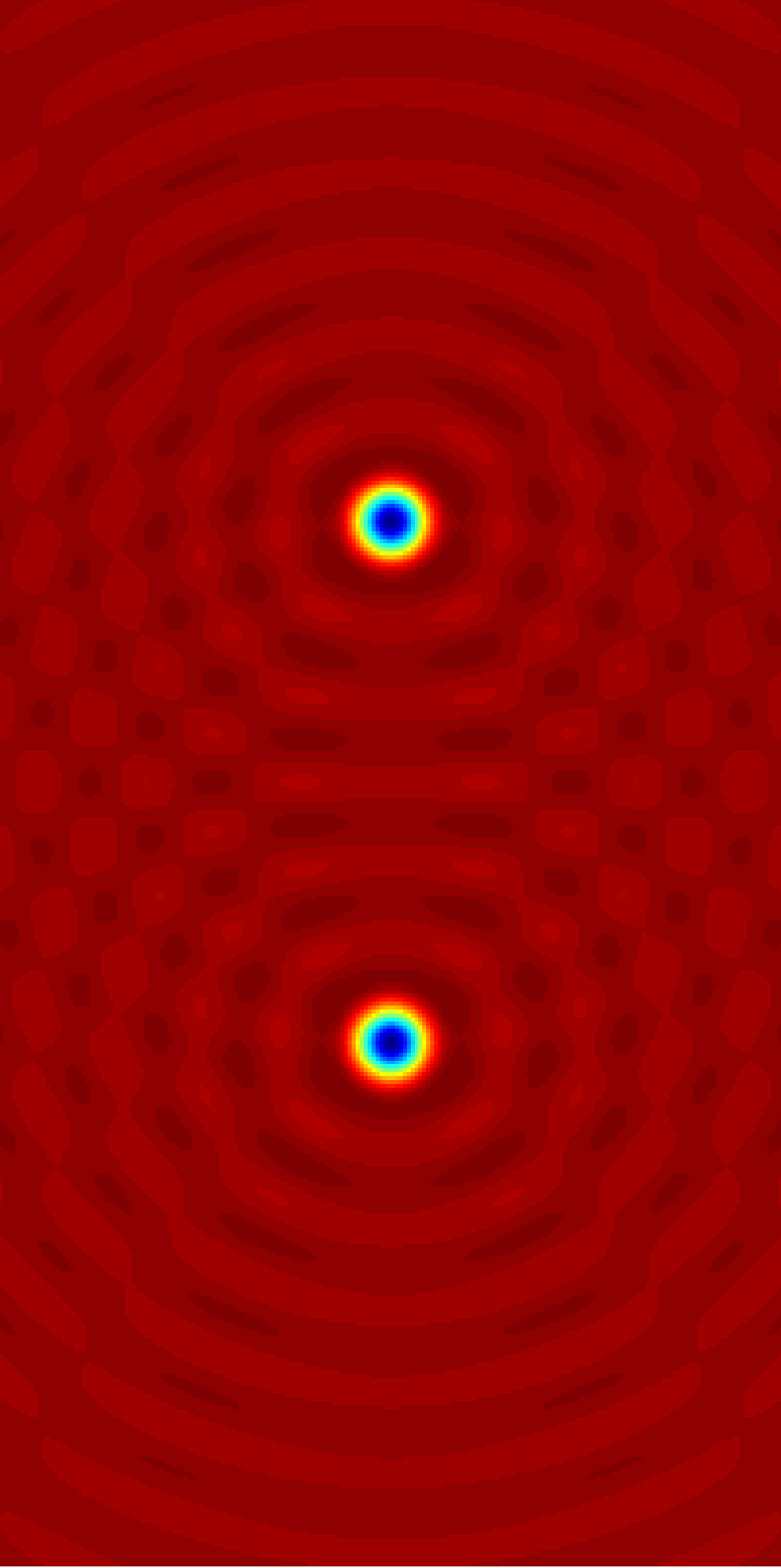
The real part of the resulting field A, A is the solution to the inhomogeneous Helmholtz equation (∇^{2} + k^{2}) A = −f.

The inhomogeneous Helmholtz equation is the equation
$$\nabla^2 A(\mathbf{x}) + k^2 A(\mathbf{x}) = -f(\mathbf{x}), \quad \forall \mathbf{x} \in \mathbb{R}^n,$$
where ƒ : R^{n} → C is a function with compact support, and n = 1, 2, 3. This equation is very similar to the screened Poisson equation, and would be identical if the plus sign (in front of the k term) were switched to a minus sign.

=== Solution ===
In order to solve this equation uniquely, one needs to specify a boundary condition at infinity, which is typically the Sommerfeld radiation condition
$$\lim_{r \to \infty} r^{\frac{n-1}{2}} \left( \frac{\partial}{\partial r} - ik \right) A(\mathbf{x}) = 0\, ,$$
in $n$ spatial dimensions, for all angles (i.e. any value of $\theta, \phi$). Here
$$r = \sqrt{\sum_{i=1}^n x_i^2 ~}$$
where $x_i$ are the coordinates of the vector $\mathbf{x} \,.$

With this condition, the solution to the inhomogeneous Helmholtz equation is

$$A(\mathbf{x}) = \int_{\R^n}\! G(\mathbf{x},\mathbf{x'})\, f(\mathbf{x'})\,\operatorname{d} \mathbf{x'}$$

(notice this integral is actually over a finite region, since f has compact support). Here, G is the Green's function of this equation, that is, the solution to the inhomogeneous Helmholtz equation with f equaling the Dirac delta function, so G satisfies

$$\nabla^2 G(\mathbf{x},\mathbf{x'}) + k^2 G(\mathbf{x},\mathbf{x'}) = -\delta(\mathbf{x},\mathbf{x'}) \in \R^n ~.$$

The expression for the Green's function depends on the dimension n of the space. One has
$$G(x,x') = \frac{ i\, e^{ik|x - x'|} }{ 2k }$$
for n = 1,

$$G(\mathbf{x},\mathbf{x'}) = \frac{ i }{ 4 }\, H^{(1)}_0\!\!\left( k \left|\mathbf{x}-\mathbf{x'}\right| \right)$$
for n = 2, where H^{(1)}_{0} is a Hankel function, and
$$G(\mathbf{x},\mathbf{x'}) = \frac{ e^{ ik \left|\mathbf{x}-\mathbf{x'}\right| } }{ 4\pi \left|\mathbf{x}-\mathbf{x'}\right| }$$
for n = 3. Note that we have chosen the boundary condition that the Green's function is an outgoing wave for |x| → ∞.

Finally, for general n,

$$G(\mathbf{x},\mathbf{x'}) ~=~ c_d\, k^p\, \frac{ H_p^{(1)}\!\!\left( k \left|\mathbf{x} - \mathbf{x'}\right| \right) }{\left|\mathbf{x} - \mathbf{x'}\right|^p }$$

where $p = \frac{n}{2} - 1$ and $c_d = \frac{ i }{ 4\, (2\pi)^p } \,.$

== See also ==
- Laplace's equation (a particular case of the Helmholtz equation)
- Weyl expansion
