= Pavel Cherenkov =

Soviet physicist (1904–1990)

- Павел Черенков
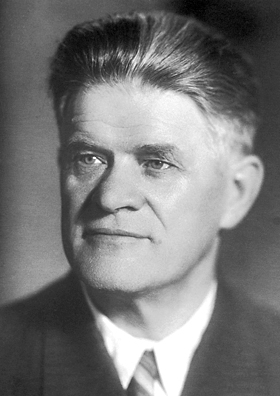
- Cherenkov in 1958
- Born: Pavel Alekseyevich Cherenkov; 28 July 1904; Novaya Chigla, Russia
- Died: 6 January 1990 (aged 85); Moscow, Soviet Union
- Resting place: Novodevichy Cemetery, Moscow
- Education: Voronezh State University
- Known for: Discovering Cherenkov radiation (1934)
- Spouse: Maria Putintseva (m. 1930)
- Awards: Nobel Prize in Physics (1958)
- Scientific career
- Fields: Physics; Nuclear physics
- Workplaces: Lebedev Physical Institute (from 1930)

Pavel Alekseyevich Cherenkov (Russian: Па́вел Алексе́евич Черенко́в [ˈpavʲɪl ɐlʲɪkˈsʲe(j)ɪvʲɪtɕ tɕɪrʲɪnˈkof]; 28 July 1904 – 6 January 1990) was a Soviet physicist who shared the 1958 Nobel Prize in Physics with Ilya Frank and Igor Tamm "for the discovery and interpretation of the Cherenkov effect".

== Biography ==
Cherenkov was born into a Russian family on July 28, 1904, to Alexey Cherenkov and Mariya Cherenkova, in the small village of Novaya Chigla in Voronezh Governorate of the Russian Empire.

In 1928, he graduated from the Department of Physics and Mathematics of Voronezh State University. In 1930, he took a post as a senior researcher in the Lebedev Physical Institute. That same year he married Maria Putintseva, daughter of A. M. Putintsev, a professor of Russian literature. They had a son, Alexey, and a daughter, Yelena.

Cherenkov was promoted to section leader, and in 1940 was awarded the degree of Doctor of Physico-Mathematical Sciences. In 1953, he was confirmed as Professor of Experimental Physics. Starting in 1959, he headed the institute's photo-meson processes laboratory. He remained a professor for fourteen years. In 1970, he became an academician of the USSR Academy of Sciences.

Cherenkov died in Moscow on 6 January 1990 and was buried in Novodevichy Cemetery.

== Discoveries in physics ==
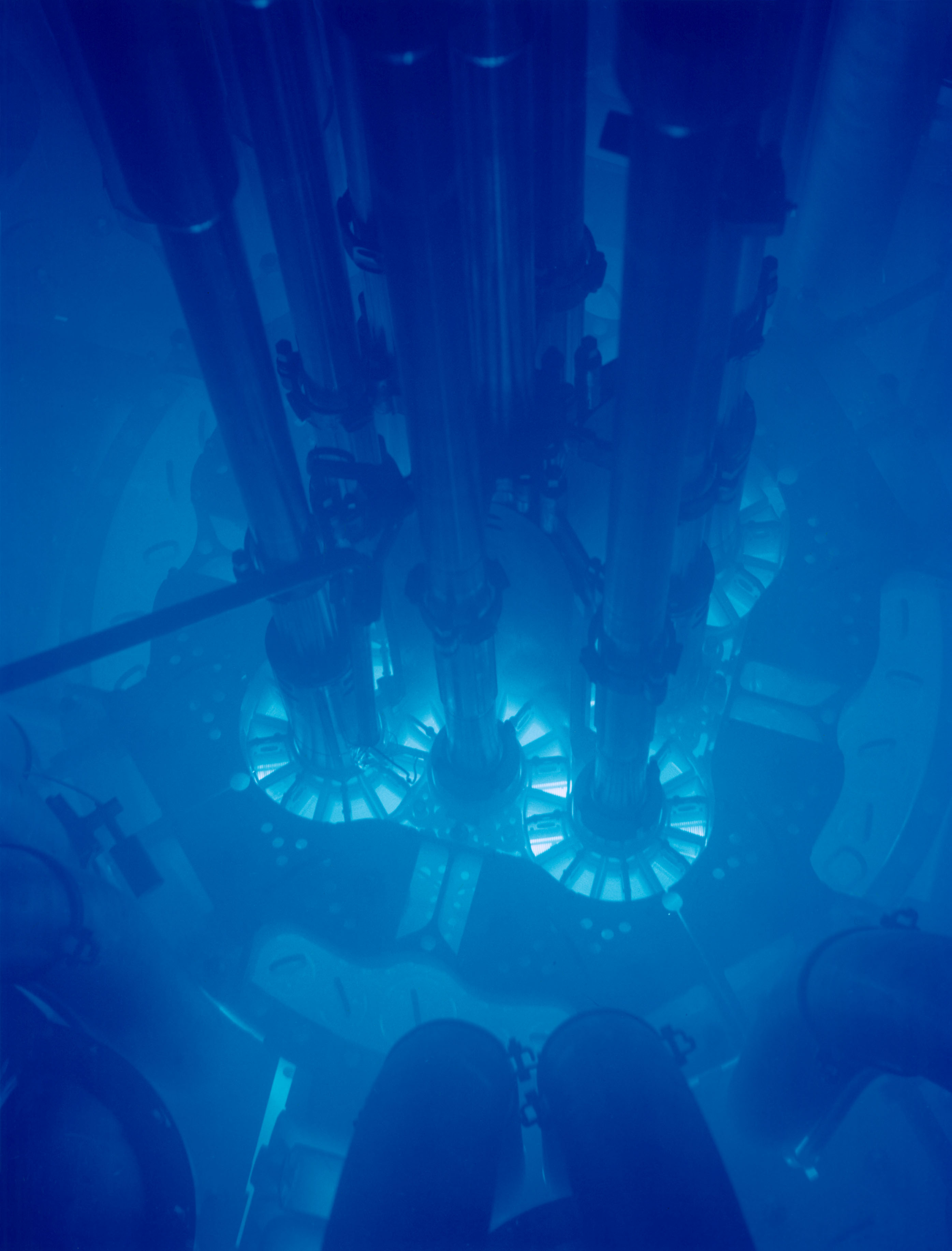
Cherenkov radiation is named for his discovery of the phenomenon; pictured here glowing is the core of the Advanced Test Reactor.

In 1934, while working under S. I. Vavilov, Cherenkov observed the emission of blue light from a bottle of water subjected to radioactive bombardment. This phenomenon, associated with charged subatomic particles moving at velocities greater than the phase velocity of light, proved to be of great importance in subsequent experimental work in nuclear physics, and for the study of cosmic rays. Eponymously, it was dubbed the Cherenkov effect, as was the Cherenkov detector, which has become a standard piece of equipment in particle-physics research for observing the existence and velocity of high-speed particles. Such a device was installed in Sputnik 3.

Pavel Cherenkov also shared in the development and construction of electron accelerators and in the investigation of photo-nuclear and photo-meson reactions.

== Awards and honours ==
Cherenkov was awarded two Stalin Prizes, the first in 1946, sharing the honor with Vavilov, Frank and Tamm, and another in 1952. He was also awarded the USSR State Prize in 1977. In 1958, he was awarded the Nobel Prize in Physics for the discovery of the Cherenkov effect. He was also awarded the Soviet Union's Hero of Socialist Labour title in 1984. Cherenkov was a member of the Communist Party of the Soviet Union since 1946.

== In popular culture ==
The novel Ghost Fleet makes the claim that many believe the Star Trek character Pavel Chekov is named after Pavel Cherenkov.

In Starship Troopers, spaceships travel faster than light using Cherenkov Drive.
