= American School Dhahran =

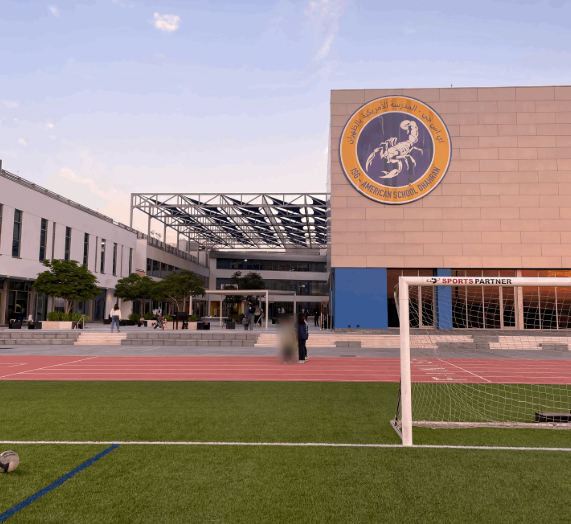
- American School Dhahran building as seen from the soccer field

Location
- Al Maha, Al Khobar 34726; Eastern Province, Saudi Arabia; 26.1879°N 50.12845°E

Information
- Former names: Dhahran High School, Dhahran Academy
- School type: Private
- Motto: We inspire innovation and compassionate action.
- Established: 1962
- CEEB code: 692103
- Principal: Brent Wingers & Eito Aotsuki
- Enrollment: 1,200+
- Website: asd.isg.edu.sa

American School Dhahran (ASD) (formerly called Dhahran Academy and Dhahran High School) is a coeducational day K-12 school located in Dhahran, Saudi Arabia as part of the International Schools Group. Founded in 1962 as Dhahran Academy, the non-profit school initially primarily served children of the staff of the US Consulate and after 1965 children of staff at the new College of Petroleum and Minerals in Dhahran. Dhahran Academy was renamed to be Dhahran High School in 1999 after the school moved to provide a full K-12 American curriculum. In 2021, ISG's Dhahran Elementary Middle School and Dhahran High School merged to become the American School Dhahran.

== Organization ==
The International Schools Group, under which ASD operates, is governed by a 12-member Board of Trustees, the leader being Andrew Law. One member of the Board is a representative of the US Consulate in Dhahran. The school operates under a license issued by the Saudi Arabian Ministry of Education. The school receives overseas assistance from the United States Department of State.

== Curriculum ==
American School Dhahran offers an American curriculum. In high school, ASD offers Advanced Placement and International Baccalaureate courses. Students may elect to pursue the IB Diploma Programme, AP Capstone Diploma, or the regular ASD Diploma. The school accepts transfer credits from selected institutions.

The college-preparatory high school offers over 60 courses in the American curriculum. In addition, the Advanced Placement program consists of 10 courses, while the International Baccalaureate Diploma Programme offers 27 courses. These IB courses are also accessible to US and AP Capstone Diploma students as certificate courses.

== History ==
Prior to the establishment of ASD, expatriates Americans based in the Saudi Aramco Residential Camp in Dhahran attended the Saudi Aramco Expatriate Schools. Children of US Consulate staff would be remotely educated with educational material sent by courier between schools in the United States and Dhahran. In the early 1960s, Saudi Aramco agreed to donate a prefabricated hut to house ASD, with a New Jersey–based public school teacher being appointed as headmaster, Robert Preston. By 1966 children of the new College of Petroleum and Minerals were the largest single group of students.

With increasing enrollment, additional classrooms were built in 1973. By 1977, enrollment at ASD increased to 1,254 pupils. A sister school, the Dhahran British Grammar School (now the British School Dhahran) was opened in the same campus. The campus was adjacent to the US Consulate in Dhahran and in close proximity to the Saudi Aramco Residential Camp in Dhahran inside the boundaries of the King Fahd University of Petroleum and Minerals. Until the establishment of high school at Dhahran Academy, most dependent expatriate children of Saudi Aramco went abroad to boarding schools for high school. American School Dhahran now receives significant enrollment from the Saudi Aramco Residential Camp and there are Aramco-operated buses between the Camp and the school.

In 2019, the International Schools Group contracted with Al Rashed Group to build a new, purpose-built campus to house the American School Dhahran and the British School Dhahran in a more remote area. The new facility is adjacent to the Canary Vista Compound in Al-Aziziyah and is closer to the King Fahad Causeway that links the Kingdom of Saudi Arabia to the Kingdom of Bahrain by land. It is 15 kilometers from the Half Moon Bay.

== See also ==
- List of schools in Saudi Arabia
