= Nonradiation condition =

Classical nonradiation conditions define the conditions according to classical electromagnetism under which a distribution of accelerating charges will not emit electromagnetic radiation. According to the Larmor formula in classical electromagnetism, a single point charge under acceleration will emit electromagnetic radiation. In some classical electron models a distribution of charges can however be accelerated so that no radiation is emitted. The modern derivation of these nonradiation conditions by Hermann A. Haus is based on the Fourier components of the current produced by a moving point charge. It states that a distribution of accelerated charges will radiate if and only if it has Fourier components synchronous with waves traveling at the speed of light.

== History ==
Finding a nonradiating model for the electron on an atom dominated the early work on atomic models. In a planetary model of the atom, the orbiting point electron would constantly accelerate towards the nucleus, and thus according to the Larmor formula emit electromagnetic waves. In 1910 Paul Ehrenfest published a short paper on "Irregular electrical movements without magnetic and radiation fields" demonstrating that Maxwell's equations allow for the existence of accelerating charge distributions which emit no radiation. In 1913, the Bohr model of the atom abandoned the efforts to explain why its bound electrons do not radiate by postulating that they did not radiate. This was later subsumed by a postulate of quantum theory called the Schrödinger equation. In the meantime, our understanding of classical nonradiation has been considerably advanced since 1925. Beginning as early as 1933, George Adolphus Schott published a surprising discovery that a charged sphere in accelerated motion (such as the electron orbiting the nucleus) may have radiationless orbits. Admitting that such speculation was out of fashion, he suggests that his solution may apply to the structure of the neutron. In 1948, Bohm and Weinstein also found that charge distributions may oscillate without radiation; they suggest that a solution which may apply to mesons. Then in 1964, Goedecke derived, for the first time, the general condition of nonradiation for an extended charge-current distribution, and produced many examples, some of which contained spin and could conceivably be used to describe fundamental particles. Goedecke was led by his discovery to speculate:

Naturally, it is very tempting to hypothesize from this that the existence of Planck's constant is implied by classical electromagnetic theory augmented by the conditions of no radiation. Such a hypothesis would be essentially equivalent to suggesting a 'theory of nature' in which all stable particles (or aggregates) are merely nonradiating charge–current distributions whose mechanical properties are electromagnetic in origin.

The nonradiation condition went largely ignored for many years. Philip Pearle reviews the subject in his 1982 article Classical Electron Models. A Reed College undergraduate thesis on nonradiation in infinite planes and solenoids appears in 1984. An important advance occurred in 1986, when Hermann Haus derived Goedecke's condition in a new way. Haus finds that all radiation is caused by Fourier components of the charge/current distribution that are lightlike (i.e. components that are synchronous with light speed). When a distribution has no lightlike Fourier components, such as a point charge in uniform motion, then there is no radiation. Haus uses his formulation to explain Cherenkov radiation in which the speed of light in the surrounding medium is less than c.

== See also ==
- Absorbing boundary condition
- Sommerfeld radiation condition
- Frank–Tamm formula
