= Dhahran =

Dhahran الظهران
- City
- Dhahran
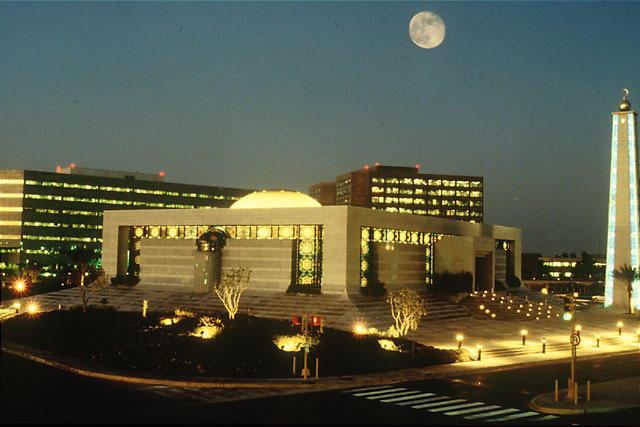

- Location within Saudi Arabia
- Coordinates: 26°16′N 50°09′E
- Country: Saudi Arabia
- Province: Eastern Province

Area
  - City: 100 km^{2} (39 sq mi)
  - Land: 100 km^{2} (39 sq mi)
  - Water: 0 km^{2} (0 sq mi)
- Elevation: 17 m (56 ft)

Population (2022)
  - City: 143,936
  - Metro: 2,190,900
- Time zone: UTC+3 (EAT)
- Postal Code: 34464
- Area code: +966-13

Dhahran (Arabic: الظهران, romanized: aẓ-Ẓahrān, pronounced [ɐðˤ.ðˤɐhˈrɑːn]) is a city located in the Eastern Province, Saudi Arabia. With a total population of 143,936 as of 2022, it is a major administrative center for the Saudi oil industry. Together with the nearby cities of Dammam and Khobar, Dhahran forms part of the Dammam Metropolitan Area, which is commonly known as greater Dammam and has an estimated population of 2.2 million as of 2022.

A Concession Agreement to search for oil was signed in Jeddah on 29 May 1933, between the Kingdom of Saudi Arabia and Standard Oil of California. However, it was not until five years later, in 1938, that the first oil in commercial quantities was produced. Standard Oil later established a subsidiary in Saudi Arabia called the Arabian American Oil Company (ARAMCO), now owned by the Saudi government and known as Saudi Aramco. Dhahran has been the home of Saudi Aramco's headquarters for 90 years and is its first and largest gated compound. Employees and dependents of Aramco, known as Aramcons, have a tendency to use Dhahran to solely refer to the Aramco Camp while using Khobar and/or Dammam to refer to the area outside the camp.

Dhahran is unusual in that a large portion of it is made up of gated areas including Saudi Aramco's headquarters and residential camp, the King Fahd University of Petroleum and Minerals (built by Aramco) and the King Abdulaziz Air Base. Dhahran is also home to the Mall of Dhahran, one of the biggest shopping complexes in the Eastern Province.

== Geography ==
Dhahran is a short distance west of downtown Khobar. It is about 15 km (9 1/4 miles) south of Dammam. Both are older Saudi port cities on the coast of the Persian Gulf. Looking farther afield, Dhahran is northeast of Abqaiq, and southeast of Qatif and, further north, Ras Tanura, a major oil port. The Kingdom of Bahrain is also within easy driving distance to the east (about 32 km or 20 miles), across the King Fahd Causeway, from Khobar.

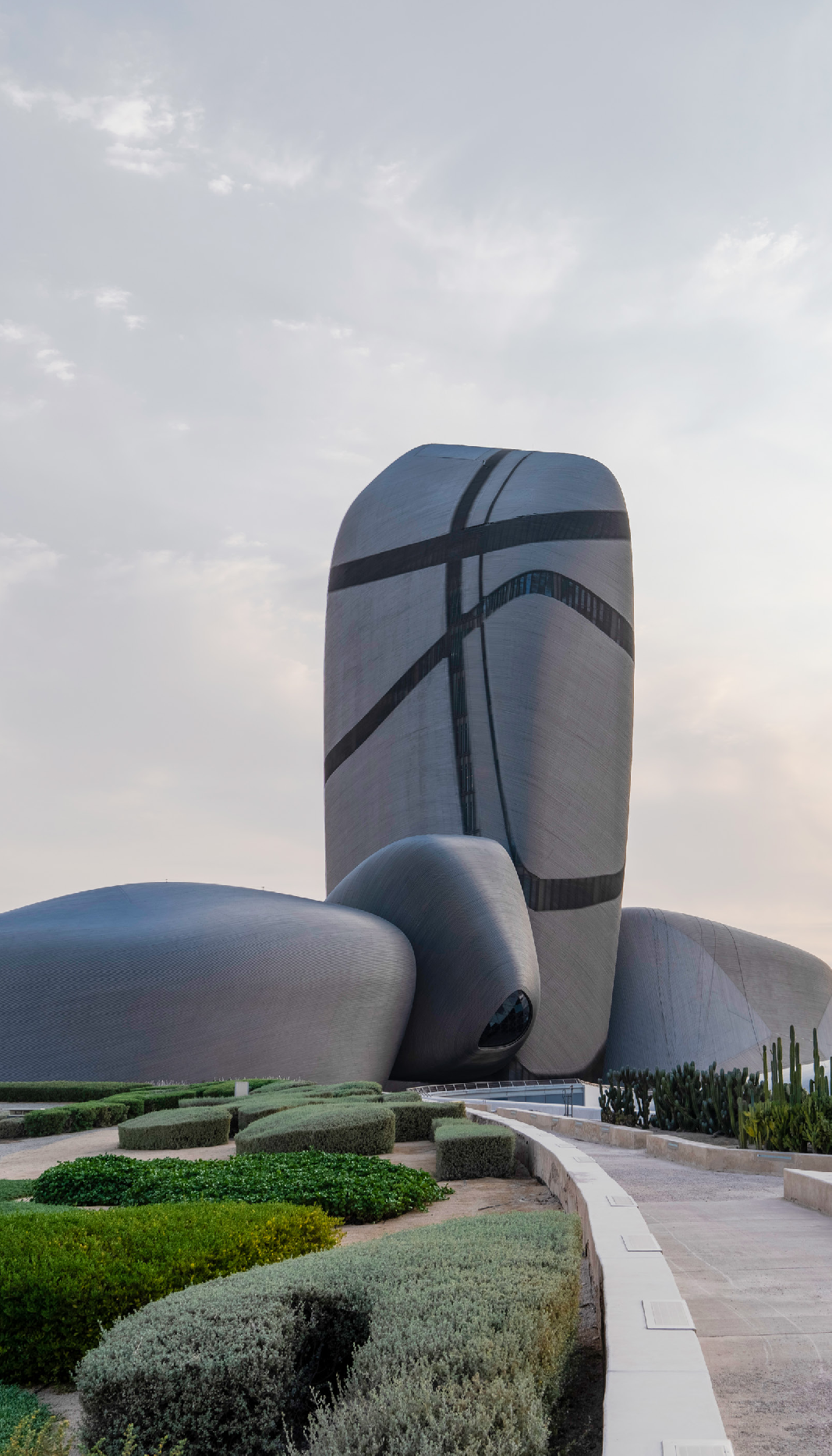
King Abdulaziz Center for World Culture (Ithra) Building

There are several notable landmarks in Dhahran City including the KFUPM clock tower as well as Saudi Aramco's Al-Midra Tower and King Abdulaziz Center for World Culture. However, the tallest building in Dhahran is Al-AbdelKareem Tower, where the neighboring Al-Othman twin towers come as second tallest, all located in Al-Qashlah district in the north east of the city facing Al-Khobar.

== Geology ==
The patch of desert on which the city is built is hilly and rocky, and most of the earliest productive oil wells in Saudi Arabia were drilled in the area, such as Dammam Well No. 7, also referred to as The Prosperity Well, the first commercially viable oil well in Saudi Arabia in the 1930s. This well was still in production 70 years later. This later led to the selection of two barren nearby hills as the place for Aramco to construct its headquarters.

The Dhahran-Dammam area is one of two regions, the other being Jeddah, that were selected as potential sites to build the first Saudi nuclear reactor.

== Climate ==
Dhahran has a hot desert climate (Köppen: BWh), featuring summers among the hottest and most humid in the world, and virtually frost-free winters. Temperatures can rise to more than 40 °C (104 °F) in the summer, coupled with high humidity, given the city's proximity to the Persian Gulf. The highest recorded temperature in Dhahran is 51.1 °C (124 °F). In winter, the temperature rarely falls below −2 °C (28 °F), with the lowest ever recorded being −5 °C (23 °F) in January 1964. Rain falls almost exclusively between the months of November and May. The Shamal winds usually blow across the city in the early months of the summer, bringing dust storms that can reduce visibility to a few metres. These winds can last for up to six months.

It was reported that on 8 July 2003, the dew point was 35 °C (95 °F) while the temperature was 42 °C (108 °F), which would indicate a heat index of 79 °C (174 °F), one of the highest heat indexes ever reported.

Climate data for Dhahran (1991-2020)
Month	Jan	Feb	Mar	Apr	May	Jun	Jul	Aug	Sep	Oct	Nov	Dec	Year
Record high °C (°F)	30.8 (87.4)	36.2 (97.2)	41.0 (105.8)	45.0 (113.0)	51.0 (123.8)	50.0 (122.0)	51.5 (124.7)	51.0 (123.8)	49.0 (120.2)	45.0 (113.0)	40.0 (104.0)	31.5 (88.7)	51.5 (124.7)
Mean daily maximum °C (°F)	21.5 (70.7)	23.6 (74.5)	27.7 (81.9)	33.5 (92.3)	39.7 (103.5)	43.0 (109.4)	44.1 (111.4)	43.5 (110.3)	40.9 (105.6)	36.6 (97.9)	29.5 (85.1)	23.8 (74.8)	34.0 (93.1)
Daily mean °C (°F)	15.7 (60.3)	17.4 (63.3)	21.0 (69.8)	26.4 (79.5)	32.1 (89.8)	35.3 (95.5)	36.3 (97.3)	35.8 (96.4)	32.9 (91.2)	28.9 (84.0)	22.8 (73.0)	17.7 (63.9)	26.9 (80.3)
Mean daily minimum °C (°F)	10.5 (50.9)	12.1 (53.8)	15.2 (59.4)	20.0 (68.0)	25.2 (77.4)	27.9 (82.2)	29.3 (84.7)	29.1 (84.4)	25.9 (78.6)	22.2 (72.0)	17.1 (62.8)	12.4 (54.3)	20.6 (69.0)
Record low °C (°F)	−1.0 (30.2)	3.0 (37.4)	5.0 (41.0)	10.0 (50.0)	14.0 (57.2)	19.4 (66.9)	21.0 (69.8)	19.5 (67.1)	18.5 (65.3)	13.4 (56.1)	7.0 (44.6)	3.0 (37.4)	−1.0 (30.2)
Average precipitation mm (inches)	19.9 (0.78)	10.9 (0.43)	16.7 (0.66)	5.5 (0.22)	0.9 (0.04)	0.0 (0.0)	0.0 (0.0)	0.0 (0.0)	0.0 (0.0)	0.1 (0.00)	24.1 (0.95)	16.7 (0.66)	94.8 (3.74)
Average precipitation days (≥ 1.0 mm)	3.0	2.0	2.8	1.7	0.3	0.0	0.0	0.0	0.0	0.0	1.8	2.6	14.2
Average relative humidity (%)	73	68	60	55	43	34	36	44	53	60	64	66	55
Average dew point °C (°F)	9 (48)	10 (50)	10 (50)	12 (54)	13 (55)	13 (55)	16 (61)	20 (68)	19 (66)	19 (66)	15 (59)	11 (52)	14 (57)
Mean monthly sunshine hours	226.3	228.8	254.2	255.0	316.2	345.0	337.9	331.7	318.0	310.0	264.0	241.8	3,428.9
Mean daily sunshine hours	7.3	8.1	8.2	8.5	10.2	11.5	10.9	10.7	10.6	10.0	8.8	7.8	9.4
Source 1: World Meteorological Organization
Source 2: NOAA (extremes and humidity, 1961-1990), Deutscher Wetterdienst (sun), Time and Date (dewpoints, 1985-2015)

== History ==
Dhahran was settled after 1938, the year oil was discovered in the vicinity. ARAMCO (then the Arabian American Oil Company, today's Saudi Aramco) built various residential areas, known as camps, to house the company's oil workers (and in some cases their families) in what was then a remote part of the desert.

During World War II, on 19 October 1940, Dhahran was struck by Italian Royal Air Force (Regia Aeronautica) as a part of Bombing of Bahrain, causing minimal damage.

In 1944, the United States was authorized to build an air base in Dhahran (officially referred to as Dhahran Airfield). Construction began in 1945 and was completed in 1946. The base was turned over to the Saudis when its lease expired in the early 1960s. Dhahran is historically significant in the development of US-Saudi relations, starting with the discovery of oil that led to the creation of ARAMCO (the Arabian American Oil Company, today's Saudi Aramco), which in turn led to the US building the Dhahran Airfield (built adjacent to Aramco's residential camp) and the construction of the former US consulate (also adjacent to the Aramco camp).

In 1950, Dhahran had a population of about 7,000 people.

During the Gulf War, the city was the scene of the largest loss of life among coalition forces. On 25 February 1991, an Iraqi Al-Hussein missile hit a U.S. Army barracks in the city, killing 28 American reservists from Pennsylvania.

== Economy ==
Dhahran hosts the headquarters of Saudi Aramco. The company is the largest oil company in the world, controlling the largest known oil reserves in the world, from which it produces about 10 million barrels of oil per day. Most of the oil is exported, since local Saudi needs only require about 12% of the total production. (See: Saudi Aramco) Nearly a century after its foundation in 1933, Dhahran is still Saudi Aramco's worldwide headquarters and the center of the company's finance, exploration, engineering, drilling services, medical services, materials supply and other company organisations.

== Demographics ==
The population of Dhahran is mainly Saudi, but also includes many expatriates from Asian countries, such as Bangladesh, India, Indonesia, Nepal, Pakistan and the Philippines, as well as countries such as the United States, Canada, European countries, Turkey, South Africa, Australia and New Zealand. There are also many non-Saudi Arab nationals living in Dhahran, such as Yemenis, Egyptians, Jordanians, Lebanese, Palestinians, Sudanese, and Syrians. The 1993 population of the city was 73,691. According to a 2004 census the total population of the Dhahran municipality is 97,446.

Many companies that employ relatively large numbers of expatriates have built fenced-in compounds where only expatriates live. However, the largest compound, the Saudi Aramco Residential Camp in Dhahran provides accommodation to many nationalities. Although built originally to house only expatriate oil company employees (mainly Americans) to provide a degree of Western comfort and separation from the restrictions of Saudi and Islamic laws, the community today has shifted somewhat in line with the reduction of western residents into a multi-ethnic mosaic of Saudis, other Arab nationalities (e.g., Egyptian and Jordanian), Asians, Europeans, South Americans, Africans and Australians. While only employees of Saudi Aramco live on the camp, their nationalities reflect those of the company as a whole. There are also several neighborhoods, or suburbs just outside the main Saudi Aramco Camp, such as Doha District (حي الدوحه) Dana District (حي الدانة) and Aljamiah District (حي الجامعة), where Saudi Aramco gives home loans to Saudi employees to build their own homes.

Dhahran is unique in a way that majority of the population live inside gated communities, whether built by Saudi Aramco, the KFUPM or the military.

== Government, law, and security ==
Dhahran is part of the Eastern Province, the largest province in Saudi Arabia. The province is governed by Prince Saud bin Nayef bin Abdulaziz Al Saud. Just like the rest of the country, the law of Sharia, or Islamic law is adhered to. Following the 2005 Saudi Arabian municipal elections, members of the municipal councils were elected.

Dhahran is guarded as it is a high visibility city. The Saudi Special Emergency Forces' Eastern Province headquarters are located in Dhahran near the Saudi Aramco residential camp. There are many security checkpoints throughout the city that have been almost permanently in place since the Riyadh Compound Bombings.

The first American consulate was opened in Dhahran in 1944.

== Transport ==
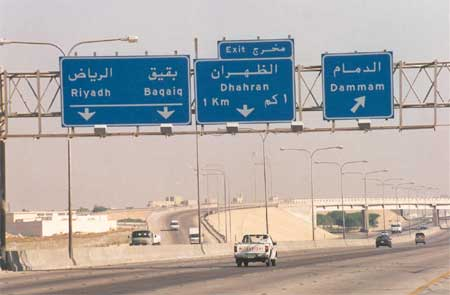
Road to the Saudi Aramco Dhahran main gate

As the centre of the nation's oil industry, Dhahran enjoys good transport resources both nationally and internationally, especially after the extensive modernisation of the nations highway infrastructure in the 1970s and 1980s.

=== Road ===
The extensive highway network in the Dhahran, Khobar, Dammam area serves the strategically important national oil industry, led by Saudi Aramco, as well as the local population. However, car ownership in the Kingdom has soared which often leaves non-highway roads congested at peak times.

=== Airport ===
Formerly one of Saudi Arabia's three major international airports, Dhahran Airport (DHA), which opened in 1946 as Dhahran Airfield, is now a Royal Saudi Air Force airbase. Today, King Fahd International Airport (DMM), which replaced Dhahran International for commercial, private and cargo, serves the entire Metropolitan Area of Dhahran, Dammam, and Khobar, the distance to the airport terminal is about 40 km (25 miles) from Dhahran. Saudi Aramco Aviation operates the general aviation terminal at King Fahd International Airport exclusively as its own terminal, where all Saudi Aramco flights originate.

=== Railway ===
Although rail service in Saudi Arabia plays a much more minor role today than 50 years ago, an industrial railroad with a station adjacent to Dhahran still exists, linking it to the capital Riyadh.

=== Public transport ===
Some frequently visited locations such as the Mall of Dhahran are covered by the Eastern Region bus run by SAPTCO(Saudi Public Transport Company). However, in most areas of Dhahran, public transit coverage is limited. Taxi services, being reasonable priced and widely available, have proven more popular. Large companies such as Saudi Aramco run their own bus transport operations, connecting residential and industrial camps of the company with Dhahran, Dammam, and Khobar. Many smaller residential compounds also operate their own bus services which are typically used for transport to places of work or shopping trips by residents.

== Communications and media ==
Mobile telephone communications are provided mainly by STC, Mobily and Zain, which have launched 3G, 4G and 5G services to their customers.

STC also provides landlines through its Al-Hatif services, as well as providing internet services through Saudi Data.

There are several internet service providers such as Al-Alamiah, ArabNet, Nesma and others. Both DSL and FTTH services are available.

There are several popular radio stations, such as Radio Sawa, Studio One 91.4 FM, broadcast from Aramco, and Bahrain Radio 96.5 FM.

Satellite television is predominant in the market, with Orbit Showtime being the most popular, as well as the widespread variety of satellite channel operators including Eutelsat, AsiaSat, Palapa, Arabsat and Nilesat.

== Education ==
Schools in Dhahran come under two sections: public (government-run) and private. Public schools (K-12), open to almost everyone, strictly adhere to teaching the curriculum exactly as provided by the Ministry of Education. Public schools also come under two sections: Saudi Aramco-built and government-built. The Saudi Aramco built schools are usually better in design and last longer due to their being built to higher standards; however, they are not operated by the company. Private schools also teach the ministry's curriculum, but they have more flexibility often enhancing certain aspects, such as exceeding the ministry's curriculum when teaching the English language and computer applications. University Schools, located within King Fahd University of Petroleum and Minerals, and Dhahran Ahliyyah Schools are examples of top private schools across Saudi Arabia are based in Dhahran.

There are several schools that teach the curriculum of their native countries, such as the Multinational School Dhahran (MNS Dhahran Multinational School Dhahran (MNS Dhahran), Dhahran British Grammar School, Dhahran Elementary Middle School, and Dhahran High School.

Dhahran High School (formerly Dhahran Academy High School) is a part of International Schools Group and is primarily composed of expatriates including American, British, Lebanese, Filipino, and Indian students. There have been Saudi students as well, though this is relatively rare. Advanced Placement courses have been available since Dhahran High School's first graduating class in 2001.

The Dhahran School and the Dhahran Hills School are Saudi Aramco-run American curriculum schools within the Saudi Aramco Residential Camp. These schools are strictly only for the children of expatriate Saudi Aramco employees but are provided completely free of charge to them. They are fully accredited and are part of the larger Saudi Aramco Schools district, encompassing all Saudi Aramco-operated schools within Aramco residential compounds.

Dhahran is also home to the world-renowned King Fahd University of Petroleum and Minerals (KFUPM), and the Aramco Training Center (ATC), where many new employees of Saudi Aramco learn useful skills, such as English, business mathematics, physics, and computer skills. Imam Abdulrahman Bin Faisal University and Prince Mohammad bin Fahd University are also located near and within the city respectively.

== Dhahran in popular culture ==
- In 1998, after the kidnapping and murder of Matthew Shepard, a gay college student from Wyoming, major American news networks would occasionally mention that the student's parents lived in Dhahran and worked for Saudi Aramco.
- In Abdelrahman Munif's Cities of Salt novels, the oil company outpost of Harran is widely believed to be Dhahran's fictional analogue.
- In the premise of Ghost Fleet, Dhahran is the victim of a terrorist attack which utilizes a dirty bomb, which causes massive damage to the world oil economy and caused anarchy around the world, and it is the first event in a string of incidents that eventually lead to World War III.
- In the first episode of the 14th season King of the Hill, Peggy states that she and her spouse, Hank, lived in Dhahran while Hank was working for Saudi Aramco.

== See also ==
- List of cities and towns in Saudi Arabia
