= Cherenkov radiation =

Electromagnetic radiation from a charged particle in a medium

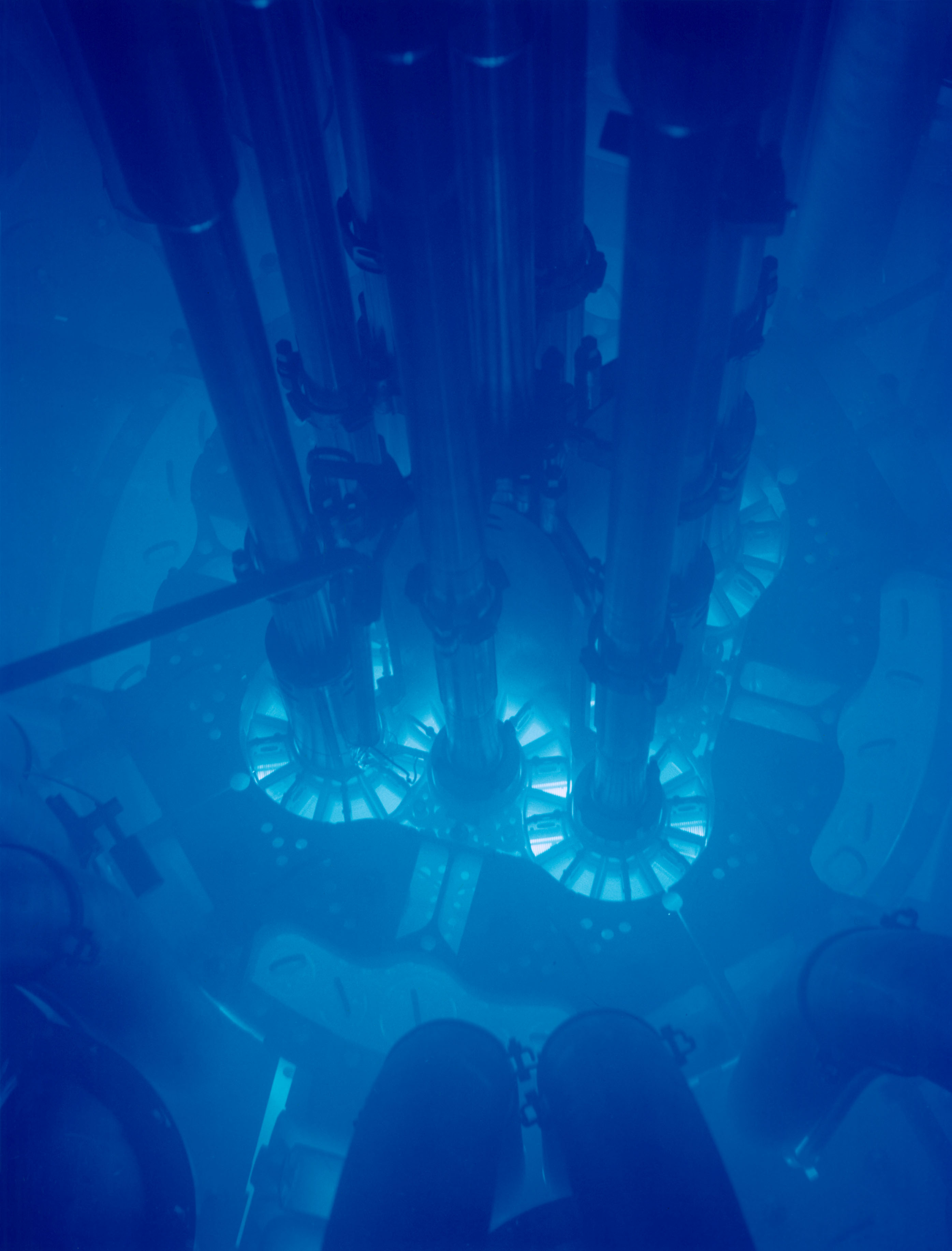
Cherenkov radiation glowing in the core of the Advanced Test Reactor at Idaho National Laboratory

Cherenkov radiation (/tʃərɛŋˈkɒf/) is electromagnetic radiation emitted when a charged particle (such as an electron) passes through a dielectric medium (such as distilled water) at a speed greater than the phase velocity (speed of propagation of a wavefront in a medium) of light in that medium. A classic example of Cherenkov radiation is the characteristic blue glow of an underwater nuclear reactor. Its cause is similar to the cause of a sonic boom, the sharp sound heard when faster-than-sound movement occurs. The phenomenon is named after Soviet physicist Pavel Cherenkov.

== History ==
The radiation is named after the Soviet scientist Pavel Cherenkov, the 1958 Nobel Prize winner, who was the first to detect it experimentally under the supervision of Sergey Vavilov at the Lebedev Institute in 1934. Therefore, it is also known as Vavilov–Cherenkov radiation. Cherenkov saw a faint bluish light around a radioactive preparation in water during experiments. His doctorate thesis was on luminescence of uranium salt solutions that were excited by gamma rays instead of less energetic visible light, as done commonly. He discovered the anisotropy of the radiation and came to the conclusion that the bluish glow was not a fluorescent phenomenon.

A theory of this effect was later developed in 1937 within the framework of Einstein's special relativity theory by Cherenkov's colleagues Igor Tamm and Ilya Frank, who also shared the 1958 Nobel Prize.

Cherenkov radiation as conical wavefronts had been theoretically predicted by the English polymath Oliver Heaviside in papers published between 1888 and 1889 and by Arnold Sommerfeld in 1904, but both had been quickly dismissed following the relativity theory's restriction of superluminal particles until the 1970s. Marie Curie observed a pale blue light in a highly concentrated radium solution in 1910, but did not investigate its source. In 1926, the French radiotherapist Lucien Mallet described the luminous radiation of radium irradiating water having a continuous spectrum.

In 2019, a team of researchers from Dartmouth's and Dartmouth-Hitchcock's Norris Cotton Cancer Center discovered Cherenkov light being generated in the vitreous humor of patients undergoing radiotherapy. The light was observed using a camera imaging system called a CDose, which is specially designed to view light emissions from biological systems. For decades, patients had reported phenomena such as "flashes of bright or blue light" when receiving radiation treatments for brain cancer, but the effects had never been experimentally observed.

== Physical origin ==
=== Basics ===
While the speed of light in vacuum is a universal constant (c = 299,792,458 m/s), the speed in a material may be significantly less, as it is perceived to be slowed by the medium. For example, in water it is only ~0.75c. Matter can accelerate to a velocity higher than this (although still less than c, the speed of light in vacuum) during nuclear reactions and in particle accelerators. Cherenkov radiation results when a charged particle, most commonly an electron, travels through a dielectric medium with a speed greater than light's speed in that medium.

The effect can be intuitively described in the following way. From classical physics, it is known that accelerating charged particles emit electromagnetic radiation (EM) waves and via Huygens' principle these waves will form spherical wavefronts which propagate with the phase velocity of that medium (i.e. the speed of light in that medium given by $c/n$, for $n$, the refractive index). When any charged particle passes through a medium, the particles of the medium will polarize around it in response. The charged particle excites the molecules in the polarizable medium and on returning to their ground state, the molecules re-emit the energy given to them to achieve excitation as photons. These photons form the spherical wavefronts which can be seen originating from the moving particle. If $v_\text{p} < c/n$, that is if the velocity of the charged particle is less than that of the speed of light in the medium, then the polarization field which forms around the moving particle is usually symmetric. The corresponding emitted wavefronts may be bunched up, but they do not coincide or cross, and there are therefore no interference effects to consider. In the reverse situation, i.e. $v_\text{p} > c/n$, the polarization field is asymmetric along the direction of motion of the particle, as the particles of the medium do not have enough time to recover to their "normal" randomized states. This results in overlapping waveforms (as in the animation) and constructive interference leads to an observed cone-like light signal at a characteristic angle: Cherenkov light.

Animation of Cherenkov radiation

A common analogy is the sonic boom of a supersonic aircraft. The sound waves generated by the aircraft travel at the speed of sound, which is slower than the aircraft, and cannot propagate forward from the aircraft, instead forming a conical shock front. In a similar way, a charged particle can generate a "shock wave" of visible light as it travels through an insulator.

The velocity that must be exceeded is the phase velocity of light rather than the group velocity of light. The phase velocity can be altered dramatically by using a periodic medium, and in that case one can even achieve Cherenkov radiation with no minimum particle velocity, a phenomenon known as the Smith–Purcell effect. In a more complex periodic medium, such as a photonic crystal, one can also obtain a variety of other anomalous Cherenkov effects, such as radiation in a backwards direction (see below) whereas ordinary Cherenkov radiation forms an acute angle with the particle velocity.

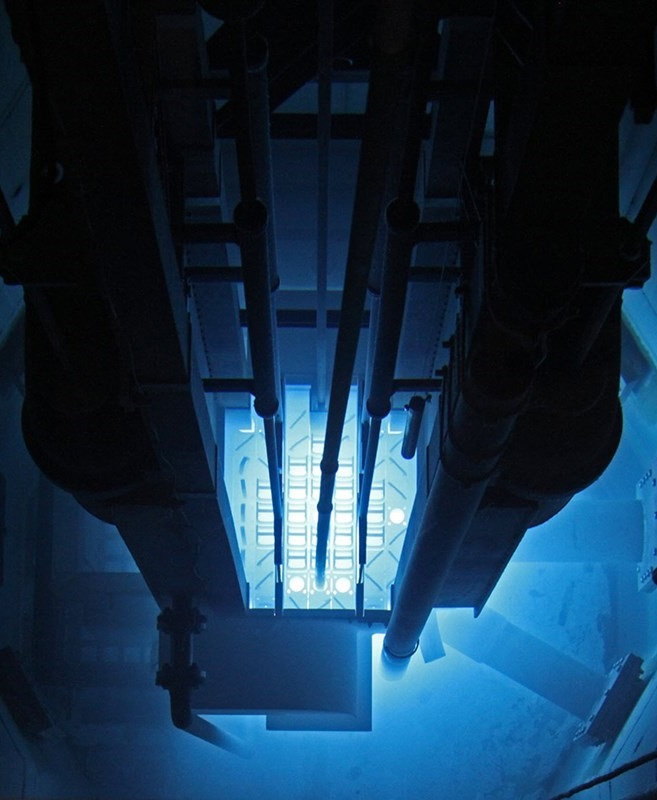
Cherenkov radiation in the University of Massachusetts Lowell Radiation Laboratory

In their original work on the theoretical foundations of Cherenkov radiation, Tamm and Frank wrote, "This peculiar radiation can evidently not be explained by any common mechanism such as the interaction of the fast electron with individual atom or as radiative scattering of electrons on atomic nuclei. On the other hand, the phenomenon can be explained both qualitatively and quantitatively if one takes into account the fact that an electron moving in a medium does radiate light even if it is moving uniformly provided that its velocity is greater than the velocity of light in the medium."

=== Emission angle ===
The geometry of the Cherenkov radiation shown for the ideal case of no dispersion.

In the figure on the geometry, the particle (red arrow) travels in a medium with speed $v_\text{p}$ such that
$$\frac{c}{n} < v_\text{p} < c,$$
where $c$ is speed of light in vacuum, and $n$ is the refractive index of the medium. If the medium is water, the condition is $0.75c < v_\text{p} < c$, since $n \approx 1.33$ for water at 20 °C.

We define the ratio between the speed of the particle and the speed of light as
$$\beta = \frac{v_\text{p}}{c}.$$
The emitted light waves (denoted by blue arrows) travel at speed
$$v_\text{em} = \frac{c}{n}.$$

The left corner of the triangle represents the location of the superluminal particle at some initial moment (t = 0). The right corner of the triangle is the location of the particle at some later time t. In the given time t, the particle travels the distance
$$x_\text{p} = v_\text{p}t = \beta\,ct$$
whereas the emitted electromagnetic waves are constricted to travel the distance
$$x_\text{em} = v_\text{em}t = \frac{c}{n}t.$$

So the emission angle results in
$$\cos\theta = \frac1{n\beta}$$

=== Arbitrary emission angle ===
Cherenkov radiation can also radiate in an arbitrary direction using properly engineered one dimensional metamaterials. The latter is designed to introduce a gradient of phase retardation along the trajectory of the fast travelling particle ($d\phi/dx$), reversing or steering Cherenkov emission at arbitrary angles given by the generalized relation:
$$\cos\theta = \frac{1}{n\beta} + \frac {n}{k_0} \cdot \frac {d\phi} {dx}$$

Note that since this ratio is independent of time, one can take arbitrary times and achieve similar triangles. The angle stays the same, meaning that subsequent waves generated between the initial time t = 0 and final time t will form similar triangles with coinciding right endpoints to the one shown.

=== Reverse Cherenkov effect ===
A reverse Cherenkov effect can be experienced using materials called negative-index metamaterials (materials with a subwavelength microstructure that gives them an effective "average" property very different from their constituent materials, in this case having negative permittivity and negative permeability). This means that, when a charged particle (usually electrons) passes through a medium at a speed greater than the phase velocity of light in that medium, that particle emits trailing radiation from its progress through the medium rather than in front of it (as is the case in normal materials with both permittivity and permeability positive). One can also obtain such reverse-cone Cherenkov radiation in non-metamaterial periodic media where the periodic structure is on the same scale as the wavelength, so it cannot be treated as an effectively homogeneous metamaterial.

=== In vacuum ===
The Cherenkov effect can occur in vacuum. In a slow-wave structure, like in a traveling-wave tube (TWT), the phase velocity decreases and the velocity of charged particles can exceed the phase velocity while remaining lower than $c$. In such a system, this effect can be derived from conservation of the energy and momentum where the momentum of a photon should be $p = \hbar\beta$ ($\beta$ is phase constant) rather than the de Broglie relation $p=\hbar k$. Vacuum Cherenkov radiation (VCR) is used to generate high-power microwaves.

=== Collective Cherenkov ===
Radiation with the same properties of typical Cherenkov radiation can be created by structures of electric current that travel faster than light. By manipulating density profiles in plasma acceleration setups, structures up to nanocoulombs of charge are created and may travel faster than the speed of light in the medium and emit optical shocks at the Cherenkov angle. Electrons are still subluminal, hence the electrons that compose the structure at a time t = t_{0} are different from the electrons in the structure at a time t > t_{0}.

== Characteristics ==
The frequency spectrum of Cherenkov radiation by a particle is given by the Frank–Tamm formula:
$$\frac{\mathrm{d}^2E}{\mathrm{d}x \, \mathrm{d}\omega} = \frac{q^2}{4 \pi} \mu(\omega) \omega {\left(1 - \frac{c^2} {v^2 n^2(\omega)}\right)}$$

The Frank–Tamm formula describes the amount of energy $E$ emitted from Cherenkov radiation, per unit length traveled $x$ and per frequency $\omega$. $\mu(\omega)$ is the permeability and $n(\omega)$ is the index of refraction of the material the charged particle moves through. $q$ is the electric charge of the particle, $v$ is the speed of the particle, and $c$ is the speed of light in vacuum.

Unlike fluorescence or emission spectra that have characteristic spectral peaks, Cherenkov radiation is continuous. Around the visible spectrum, the relative intensity per unit frequency is approximately proportional to the frequency, with higher frequencies (shorter wavelengths) being more intense in Cherenkov radiation. Visible Cherenkov radiation is observed to be brilliant blue because while most Cherenkov radiation is in the ultraviolet spectrum, it is only with sufficiently accelerated charges that it even becomes visible; the sensitivity of the human eye peaks at green, and is very low in the violet portion of the spectrum.

There is a cut-off frequency above which the equation $\cos\theta = 1/(n\beta)$ can no longer be satisfied. The refractive index $n$ varies with frequency (and hence with wavelength) in such a way that the intensity cannot continue to increase at ever shorter wavelengths, even for very relativistic particles (where v/c is close to 1). At X-ray frequencies, the refractive index becomes less than 1 (note that in media, the phase velocity may exceed c without violating relativity) and hence no X-ray emission (or shorter wavelength emissions such as gamma rays) would be observed. However, X-rays can be generated at special frequencies just below the frequencies corresponding to core electronic transitions in a material, as the index of refraction is often greater than 1 just below a resonant frequency.

As in sonic booms and bow shocks, the angle of the shock cone is directly related to the velocity of the disruption. The Cherenkov angle is zero at the threshold velocity for the emission of Cherenkov radiation. The angle takes on a maximum as the particle speed approaches the speed of light. Hence, observed angles of incidence can be used to compute the direction and speed of a Cherenkov radiation-producing charge.

Cherenkov radiation can be generated in the eye by charged particles hitting the vitreous humour, giving the impression of flashes, as in cosmic ray visual phenomena and possibly some observations of criticality accidents.

== Uses ==
=== Detection of labelled biomolecules ===
Cherenkov radiation is widely used to facilitate the detection of small amounts and low concentrations of biomolecules. Radioactive atoms such as phosphorus-32 are readily introduced into biomolecules by enzymatic and synthetic means and subsequently may be easily detected in small quantities for the purpose of elucidating biological pathways and in characterizing the interaction of biological molecules such as affinity constants and dissociation rates.

=== Medical imaging of radioisotopes and external beam radiotherapy ===
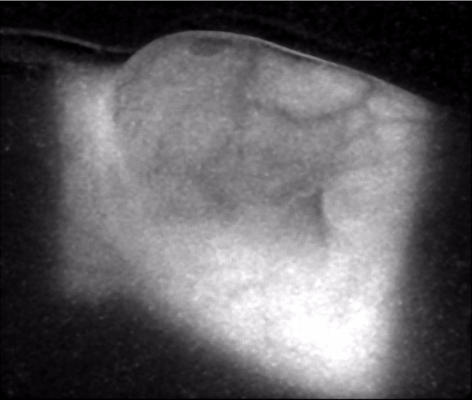
Cherenkov light emission imaged from the chest wall of a patient undergoing whole breast irradiation, using 6 MeV beam from a linear accelerator in radiotherapy.

More recently, Cherenkov light has been used to image substances in the body. These discoveries have led to intense interest around the idea of using this light signal to quantify and/or detect radiation in the body, either from internal sources such as injected radiopharmaceuticals or from external beam radiotherapy in oncology. Radioisotopes such as the positron emitters ^{18}F and ^{13}N or beta emitters ^{32}P or ^{90}Y have measurable Cherenkov emission and isotopes ^{18}F and ^{131}I have been imaged in humans for diagnostic value demonstration.

External beam radiation therapy has been shown to induce a substantial amount of Cherenkov light in the tissue being treated, due to electron beams or photon beams with energy in the 6 MV to 18 MV ranges. The secondary electrons induced by these high energy x-rays result in the Cherenkov light emission, where the detected signal can be imaged at the entry and exit surfaces of the tissue. The Cherenkov light emitted from patient's tissue during radiation therapy is a very low light level signal but can be detected by specially designed cameras that synchronize their acquisition to the linear accelerator pulses. The ability to see this signal shows the shape of the radiation beam as it is incident upon the tissue in real time.

=== Nuclear reactors ===
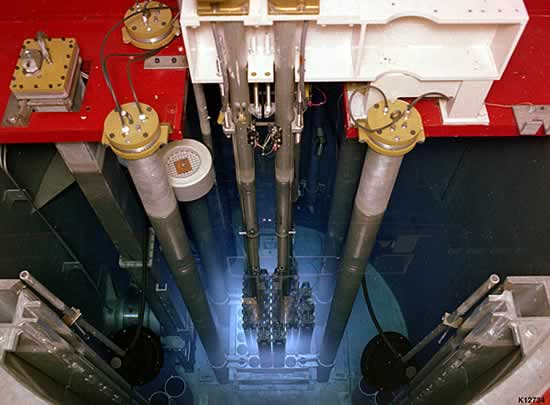
Cherenkov radiation in a TRIGA reactor pool.

Cherenkov radiation is used to detect high-energy charged particles. In open pool reactors, beta particles (high-energy electrons) are released as the fission products decay. The glow continues after the chain reaction stops, dimming as the shorter-lived products decay. Similarly, Cherenkov radiation can characterize the remaining radioactivity of spent fuel rods. This phenomenon is used to verify the presence of spent nuclear fuel in spent fuel pools for nuclear safeguards purposes.

=== Astrophysics experiments ===
When a high-energy (TeV) gamma photon or cosmic ray interacts with the Earth's atmosphere, it may produce an electron–positron pair with enormous velocities. The Cherenkov radiation emitted in the atmosphere by these charged particles is used to determine the direction and energy of the cosmic ray or gamma ray, which is used for example in the Imaging Atmospheric Cherenkov Technique (IACT), by experiments such as VERITAS, H.E.S.S., MAGIC. Cherenkov radiation emitted in tanks filled with water by those charged particles reaching earth is used for the same goal by the Extensive Air Shower experiment HAWC, the Pierre Auger Observatory and other projects. Similar methods are used in very large neutrino detectors, such as the Super-Kamiokande, the Sudbury Neutrino Observatory (SNO) and IceCube. Other projects operated in the past applying related techniques, such as STACEE, a former solar tower refurbished to work as a non-imaging Cherenkov observatory, which was located in New Mexico.

Astrophysics observatories using the Cherenkov technique to measure air showers are key to determining the properties of astronomical objects that emit very-high-energy gamma rays, such as supernova remnants and blazars.

=== Particle physics experiments ===
Cherenkov radiation is commonly used in experimental particle physics for particle identification. One could measure (or put limits on) the velocity of an electrically charged elementary particle by the properties of the Cherenkov light it emits in a certain medium. If the momentum of the particle is measured independently, one could compute the mass of the particle by its momentum and velocity (see four-momentum), and hence identify the particle.

The simplest type of particle identification device based on a Cherenkov radiation technique is the threshold counter, which answers whether the velocity of a charged particle is lower or higher than a certain value ($v_0 = c/n$, where $c$ is the speed of light, and $n$ is the refractive index of the medium) by looking at whether this particle emits Cherenkov light in a certain medium. Knowing particle momentum, one can separate particles lighter than a certain threshold from those heavier than the threshold.

The most advanced type of a detector is the RICH, or ring-imaging Cherenkov detector, developed in the 1980s. In a RICH detector, a cone of Cherenkov light is produced when a high-speed charged particle traverses a suitable medium, often called radiator. This light cone is detected on a position sensitive planar photon detector, which allows reconstructing a ring or disc, whose radius is a measure for the Cherenkov emission angle. Both focusing and proximity-focusing detectors are in use. In a focusing RICH detector, the photons are collected by a spherical mirror and focused onto the photon detector placed at the focal plane. The result is a circle with a radius independent of the emission point along the particle track. This scheme is suitable for low refractive index radiators—i.e. gases—due to the larger radiator length needed to create enough photons. In the more compact proximity-focusing design, a thin radiator volume emits a cone of Cherenkov light which traverses a small distance—the proximity gap—and is detected on the photon detector plane. The image is a ring of light whose radius is defined by the Cherenkov emission angle and the proximity gap. The ring thickness is determined by the thickness of the radiator. An example of a proximity gap RICH detector is the High Momentum Particle Identification Detector (HMPID), a detector currently under construction for ALICE (A Large Ion Collider Experiment), one of the six experiments at the LHC (Large Hadron Collider) at CERN.

== See also ==
- Askaryan radiation, similar radiation produced by fast uncharged particles
- Blue noise
- Bremsstrahlung, radiation produced when charged particles are decelerated by other charged particles
- Faster-than-light, about conjectural propagation of information or matter faster than the speed of light
- Frank–Tamm formula, giving the spectrum of Cherenkov radiation
- Light echo
- List of light sources
- Non-radiation condition
- Radioluminescence
- Sonic boom
- Tachyon
- Transition radiation

== Sources ==
- Landau, L. D.; Lifshitz, E. M.; Pitaevskii, L. P. (1984). Electrodynamics of Continuous Media. New York: Pergamon Press. ISBN 978-0-08-030275-1.
- Jelley, J. V. (1958). Cerenkov Radiation and Its Applications. London: Pergamon Press.
- Smith, S. J.; Purcell, E. M. (1953). "Visible Light from Localized Surface Charges Moving across a Grating". Physical Review. 92 (4): 1069. Bibcode:1953PhRv...92.1069S. doi:10.1103/PhysRev.92.1069.
