= Frank–Tamm formula =

Calculation of Cherenkov radiation levels

The Frank–Tamm formula yields the amount of Cherenkov radiation emitted on a given frequency as a charged particle moves through a medium at superluminal velocity. It is named for Russian physicists Ilya Frank and Igor Tamm, who developed the theory of the Cherenkov effect in 1937, for which they were awarded a Nobel Prize in Physics in 1958.

When a charged particle moves faster than the phase speed of light in a medium, electrons interacting with the particle can emit coherent photons while conserving energy and momentum. This process can be viewed as a decay. See Cherenkov radiation and nonradiation condition for an explanation of this effect.

== Equation ==
The energy $dE$ emitted per unit length travelled by the particle per unit of frequency $d\omega$ is:
$$\frac{\partial^2E}{\partial x \, \partial\omega} = \frac{q^2}{4 \pi} \mu(\omega) \omega \left(1 - \frac{c^2} {v^2 n^2(\omega)}\right)$$
provided that $\beta = \frac{v}{c} > \frac{1}{n(\omega)}$. Here $\mu(\omega)$ and $n(\omega)$ are the frequency-dependent permeability and index of refraction of the medium respectively, $q$ is the electric charge of the particle, $v$ is the speed of the particle, and $c$ is the speed of light in vacuum.

Cherenkov radiation does not have characteristic spectral peaks, as typical for fluorescence or emission spectra. The relative intensity of one frequency is approximately proportional to the frequency. That is, higher frequencies (shorter wavelengths) are more intense in Cherenkov radiation. This is why visible Cherenkov radiation is observed to be brilliant blue. In fact, most Cherenkov radiation is in the ultraviolet spectrum; the sensitivity of the human eye peaks at green, and is very low in the violet portion of the spectrum.

The total amount of energy radiated per unit length is:
$$\frac{dE}{dx} = \frac{q^2}{4 \pi} \int_{v > \frac{c}{n(\omega)}} \mu(\omega) \omega \left(1 - \frac{c^2} {v^2 n^2(\omega)}\right) \, d\omega$$

This integral is done over the frequencies $\omega$ for which the particle's speed $v$ is greater than speed of light of the media $\frac{c}{n(\omega)}$. The integral is convergent (finite) because at high frequencies the refractive index becomes less than unity and for extremely high frequencies it becomes unity. (Note: The refractive index n is defined as the ratio of the speed of electromagnetic radiation in vacuum and the phase speed of electromagnetic waves in a medium and can, under specific circumstances, become less than one. See refractive index for further information.) (Note: The refractive index can become less than unity near the resonance frequency but at extremely high frequencies the refractive index becomes unity.)

== Derivation of Frank–Tamm formula ==
Consider a charged particle moving relativistically along $x$-axis in a medium with refraction index $n(\omega) = \sqrt{\varepsilon(\omega)}$ (Note: For simplicity we consider magnetic permeability $\mu(\omega) = 1$.) with a constant velocity $\vec v = (v,0,0)$. Start with Maxwell's equations (in Gaussian units) in the wave forms (also known as the Lorenz gauge condition) and take the Fourier transform:
$$\left ( k^2 - \frac{\omega^2}{c^2} \varepsilon(\omega) \right) \Phi(\vec k,\omega) = \frac{ 4 \pi}{\varepsilon(\omega)} \rho(\vec k, \omega)$$
$$\left ( k^2 - \frac{\omega^2}{c^2} \varepsilon(\omega) \right) \vec A(\vec k,\omega) = \frac{ 4 \pi}{c} \vec J(\vec k, \omega)$$

For a charge of magnitude $ze$ (where $e$ is the elementary charge) moving with velocity $v$, the density and charge density can be expressed as $\rho(\vec x, t) = q \delta(\vec x - \vec v t)$ and $\vec J(\vec x,t) = \vec v \rho(\vec x,t)$, taking the Fourier transform (Note: We use engineering notation for the Fourier transform, where $1/\sqrt{2\pi}$ factors appear both in direct and inverse transforms.) gives:
$$\rho(\vec k, \omega) = \frac{ q}{2 \pi} \delta(\omega - \vec k \cdot \vec v)$$
$$\vec J(\vec k, \omega) = \vec v \rho (\vec k ,\omega)$$

Substituting this density and charge current into the wave equation, we can solve for the Fourier-form potentials:
$$\Phi(\vec k, \omega) = \frac{2 q}{\varepsilon(\omega)} \frac{ \delta(\omega - \vec k \cdot \vec v)}{k^2 - \frac{\omega^2}{c^2} \varepsilon(\omega)}$$
and
$$\vec A(\vec k,\omega) = \varepsilon(\omega) \frac{\vec v}{c} \Phi(\vec k,\omega)$$

Using the definition of the electromagnetic fields in terms of potentials, we then have the Fourier-form of the electric and magnetic field:
$$\vec E(\vec k,\omega) = i \left( \frac{\omega \varepsilon(\omega)}{c} \frac{\vec v}{c} - \vec k \right) \Phi(\vec k,\omega)$$
and
$$\vec B(\vec k,\omega) = i \varepsilon(\omega) \vec k \times \frac{\vec v}{c} \Phi(\vec k,\omega)$$

To find the radiated energy, we consider electric field as a function of frequency at some perpendicular distance from the particle trajectory, say, at $(0,b,0)$, where $b$ is the impact parameter. It is given by the inverse Fourier transform:
$$\vec E(\omega) = \frac{1}{ ( 2 \pi)^{3/2}} \int d^3k \, \vec E(\vec k,\omega) e^{i bk_2}$$

First we compute $x$-component $E_1$ of the electric field (parallel to $\vec v$):
$$E_1(\omega) = \frac{2 i q}{\varepsilon(\omega) ( 2\pi)^{3/2}} \int d^3k \, e^{i bk_2} \left( \frac{ \omega \varepsilon(\omega) v}{c^2} - k_1 \right ) \frac{\delta(\omega - v k_1)}{k^2 - \frac{\omega^2}{c^2} \varepsilon(\omega)}$$

For brevity we define $\lambda^2 = \frac{\omega^2}{v^2} - \frac{\omega^2}{c^2} \varepsilon(\omega) = \frac{\omega^2}{v^2} \left ( 1 - \beta^2 \varepsilon(\omega) \right )$. Breaking the integral apart into $k_1, k_2, k_3$, the $k_1$ integral can immediately be integrated by the definition of the Dirac Delta:
$$E_1(\omega) = - \frac{2 i q \omega}{v^2 ( 2\pi)^{3/2}} \left( \frac{1}{\varepsilon(\omega)} - \beta^2 \right) \int_{-\infty}^\infty dk_2 \, e^{i bk_2}  \int_{-\infty}^\infty \frac{dk_3}{k_2^2 + k_3^2 + \lambda^2}$$

The integral over $k_3$ has the value $\frac{\pi}{ \left(\lambda^2 + k^2_2 \right)^{1/2}}$, giving:
$$E_1(\omega) = - \frac{ i q \omega}{v^2 \sqrt{2\pi}} \left( \frac{1}{\varepsilon(\omega)} - \beta^2 \right) \int_{-\infty}^\infty dk_2 \frac{e^{i bk_2}}{(\lambda^2 + k_2^2)^{1/2}}$$

The last integral over $k_2$ is in the form of a modified (Macdonald) Bessel function, giving the evaluated parallel component in the form:
$$E_1(\omega) = - \frac{i q \omega}{v^2} \left( \frac{2}{\pi} \right)^{1/2} \left( \frac{1}{\varepsilon(\omega)} - \beta^2 \right) K_0(\lambda b)$$

One can follow a similar pattern of calculation for the other fields components arriving at:

$E_2(\omega) = \frac{q}{v} \left( \frac{2}{\pi} \right)^{1/2} \frac{\lambda}{\varepsilon(\omega)} K_1(\lambda b), \quad E_3 = 0 \quad$ and $\quad B_1 = B_2 = 0, \quad B_3(\omega) = \varepsilon(\omega) \beta E_2(\omega)$

We can now consider the radiated energy $dE$ per particle traversed distance $dx_{\text{particle}}$. It can be expressed through the electromagnetic energy flow $P_a$ through the surface of an infinite cylinder of radius $a$ around the path of the moving particle, which is given by the integral of the Poynting vector $\mathbf S = c / (4 \pi) [ \mathbf E \times \mathbf H]$ over the cylinder surface:
$$\left( \frac{dE}{dx_{\text{particle}}} \right)_{\text{rad}} = \frac{1}{v} P_a = - \frac{c}{4 \pi v} \int_{-\infty}^{\infty} 2 \pi a B_3 E_1 \, dx$$

The integral over $dx$ at one instant of time is equal to the integral at one point over all time. Using $dx = v \, dt$:
$$\left( \frac{dE}{dx_{\text{particle}}} \right)_{\text{rad}} = - \frac{c a }{2} \int_{-\infty}^\infty B_3(t) E_1(t) \, dt$$

Converting this to the frequency domain:
$$\left( \frac{dE}{dx_{\text{particle}}} \right)_{\text{rad}} = -c a \operatorname{Re} \left(  \int_0^\infty B_3^*(\omega) E_1(\omega) \, d\omega \right)$$

To go into the domain of Cherenkov radiation, we now consider perpendicular distance $b$ much greater than atomic distances in a medium, that is, $| \lambda b | \gg 1$. With this assumption we can expand the Bessel functions into their asymptotic form:
$$E_1(\omega) \rightarrow \frac{i q \omega}{c^2} \left( 1 -  \frac{1}{\beta^2 \varepsilon(\omega)} \right) \frac{e^{-\lambda b}}{\sqrt{\lambda b}}$$

$E_2(\omega) \rightarrow \frac{q}{v \varepsilon(\omega)} \sqrt{\frac{\lambda}{b}} e^{-\lambda b}$ and $B_3(\omega) = \varepsilon(\omega) \beta E_2(\omega)$

Thus:

$$\left( \frac{dE}{dx_{\text{particle}}} \right)_{\text{rad}} = \operatorname{Re} \left( \int_0^\infty \frac{q^2}{c^2} \left(-i \sqrt{\frac{\lambda^*}{\lambda} }\right) \omega \left( 1 - \frac{1}{\beta^2 \varepsilon(\omega) } \right) e^{-(\lambda + \lambda^*) a} \, d\omega \right)$$

If $\lambda$ has a positive real part (usually true), the exponential will cause the expression to vanish rapidly at large distances, meaning all the energy is deposited near the path. However, this is not true when $\lambda$ is purely imaginary – this instead causes the exponential to become 1 and then is independent of $a$, meaning some of the energy escapes to infinity as radiation – this is Cherenkov radiation.

$\lambda$ is purely imaginary if $\varepsilon(\omega)$ is real and $\beta^2 \varepsilon(\omega) > 1$. That is, when $\varepsilon(\omega)$ is real, Cherenkov radiation has the condition that $v > \frac{c}{\sqrt{\varepsilon(\omega})} = \frac{c}{n}$. This is the statement that the speed of the particle must be larger than the phase velocity of electromagnetic fields in the medium at frequency $\omega$ in order to have Cherenkov radiation. With this purely imaginary $\lambda$ condition, $\sqrt{{\lambda^*}/{\lambda}} = i$ and the integral can be simplified to:
$$\left( \frac{dE}{dx_{\text{particle}}} \right)_{\text{rad}} = \frac{ q^2}{c^2} \int_{\varepsilon(\omega) > \frac{1}{\beta^2}} \omega \left( 1 - \frac{1}{\beta^2 \varepsilon(\omega)} \right) \, d\omega = \frac{ q^2}{c^2} \int_{v > \frac{c}{n(\omega)}} \omega \left( 1 - \frac{c^2}{v^2 n^2(\omega)} \right) \, d\omega$$

This is the Frank–Tamm equation in Gaussian units.
