= Ghost Fleet (novel) =

2015 book by P. W. Singer and August Cole

Ghost Fleet: A Novel of the Next World War
- First edition
- Authors: P. W. Singer; August Cole
- Language: English
- Publisher: Houghton Mifflin Harcourt
- Publication date: June 30, 2015
- Publication place: United States
- Media type: Print
- Pages: 416
- ISBN: 9780544142848

Ghost Fleet: A Novel of the Next World War is a 2015 techno-thriller by P. W. Singer and August Cole. Set in the near future, the book portrays a scenario in which a post-communist China, assisted by Russia, launches a technologically sophisticated attack against the United States in the Pacific Ocean that leads to the occupation of the Hawaiian Islands.

== Plot ==
Prior to the main events of the novel, Indonesia collapsed into a failed state after a second war in Timor, and a dirty bomb was detonated in Dhahran, Saudi Arabia, which caused a massive spike in the price of oil and the collapse of the House of Saud. A newly discovered natural gas field in the Mariana Trench provides China with energy security. Popular unrest leads to the removal of the Chinese Communist Party, and China becomes governed by a mix of businessmen and military leaders known as the Directorate. China and Russia have also developed the ability to detect and to track nuclear-powered ships by using Cherenkov radiation, which allows China to effectively neutralize the US Navy's nuclear submarine fleet. China plans to gain control of the third island chain and to secure dominance in the western Pacific Ocean. Meanwhile, the US military is overstretched in terms of manpower and resources from ongoing military operations in Afghanistan, Yemen, and Kenya.

Using a computer virus to infiltrate the computer systems of the Defense Intelligence Agency, China launches a massive cyberattack on the United States that cripples many sophisticated systems, including the F-35 Lightning, which has been compromised with infected microchips in the supply chain. The attack includes the extensive use of anti-satellite weapons, which leads to the disabling of the Global Positioning System and the loss of several communications and reconnaissance satellites, which are critical to the US military. Russian fighters and drones launch a raid on the US military base in Okinawa, and the US military presence in Japan is neutralized. Supported by Russia, China captures Hawaii after a bloody battle and establishes the Hawaii Special Administrative Zone. The attack leads to the near-complete destruction of the US Pacific Fleet.

The titular "Ghost Fleet" refers to the US Navy reserve fleets, which the United States reactivates as a low-tech fallback. The residents of Oʻahu and the surviving US military personnel launch an insurgency, known as the North Shore Mujahideen (NSM), against the Chinese occupiers by using the tactics that have been learned from insurgents during the Iraq and Afghanistan wars. On the diplomatic front, the remaining allies of the United States remain neutral in the conflict except for Australia and the United Kingdom, the latter of which endures the secession of Scotland after a second independence referendum, which passed shortly after the attack. As part of what is dubbed a “Nuclear Lend-Lease” program to counter China and Russia's Cherenkov radiation detection systems, Poland secretly lends several of its diesel-powered submarines to the US Navy in exchange for the delivery of ten B83 thermonuclear bombs to Poland to deter Russia. After the dissolution of NATO, the United States recognizes Greenland's independence from Denmark in exchange for using the fleet of the newly renamed Kalaallit Nunaat, whose icebreakers move the ghost fleet through the Northwest Passage.

On the civilian front, private companies, such as Walmart, establish a supply chain using 3D printing technology to provide supplies for the war effort, and the US government initiates a program to recycle old microchips to negate the effects of the infected ones from China. An eccentric Silicon Valley billionaire uses his personal wealth and resources to seize control of the Chinese space station and neutralize China's anti-satellite systems by a private military company in his employ. Simultaneously, another Silicon Valley magnate wages his own separate campaign against China by using his connections to get into contact with the hacktivist group Anonymous. The group manages to launch its own cyberattack, which cripples the Directorate's cyberwarfare capabilities indefinitely. The US military ultimately manages to liberate Hawaii with the aid by the Ghost Fleet, the 82nd Airborne Division, the US Marine Corps, the US Special Operations Command, SEAL Team Six, Polish Special Forces JW Formoza, and aircraft reactivated from the US Air Force boneyard. The war ends in a status quo ante bellum, with both the United States and the Directorate recovering from the effects of the conflict. However, Russia breaks up into a collection of smaller states after a coup d'état against the Russian president (heavily implied to be Vladimir Putin) as a result of public opposition to Russia's participation in the war (the "Russian People's Republic").

One of the subplots in the story revolves around Carrie Shin, a surf instructor at the Moana Surfrider Hotel. She had been engaged to a fighter pilot in the US Marine Corps and was in the process of preparing for her wedding when the invasion of Hawaii began. It is implied that she had been the victim of systematic sexual and physical abuse at the hands of her father and was recovering with the help of her fiancé. He is subsequently killed during the invasion when his F-35 is compromised by Chinese malware. Now psychologically changed, she begins a systematic campaign of killing the Chinese soldiers occupying Honolulu, which earns her the moniker the "Black Widow." Her killings come to the attention of both General Yu Xilai, the Chinese commander of the occupation, and his subordinate, Russian Colonel Vladimir Markov, who is constantly belittled and dismissed by Yu as incompetent for being unable to suppress the insurgency. Shin and Markov gain a grudging respect for one another, and she feigns being captured to get close to Yu, whom she strangles to death at his headquarters. Markov watches with silent consent just as the US counterattack begins.

== Characters ==
- Commander Jamie Simmons, initially an executive officer for the USS Coronado but is placed in command of the USS Zumwalt after the Battle of Hawaii.
- Chief Mike Simmons, a US Navy veteran who works at the National Defense Reserve Fleet and is father of Jamie Simmons.
- Major Carolyne “Conan” Doyle, a US Marine Corps officer on O'ahu during the Directorate invasion who later becomes one of the primary leaders of the island's resistance movement, the North Shore Mujahideen (NSM).
- Dr. Qi Jiangyong (Chinese: 齐江勇; pinyin: Qí Jiāngyǒng), a Chinese surgeon who uses BrainGate-inspired brain implant technology to conduct interrogations.
- Daniel Aboye, a "Lost Boy" of Sudan turned Silicon Valley magnate. He helps marshal the information technology war effort, including Anonymous.
- Colonel Vladimir Andreyevich Markov (Russian: Владимир Андреевич Марков), a Spetsnaz officer stationed in Hawaii after its capture.
- Vice Admiral Wang Xiaoqian (Chinese: 王小谦; pinyin: Wáng Xiǎoqiān), a leading military figure in the Directorate.
- Sir Aeric K. Cavendish, an Australian biotech billionaire, born Archis Kumar, who uses his private military company to neutralize the Tiangong-3 space station during the later stages of the war.
- Admiral Agathe Abelsen, the leading naval figure of the newly independent Republic of Kalaallit Nunaat (formerly Greenland).
- General Yu Xilai (Chinese: 于熙来; pinyin: Yú Xīlái), the head of the Hawaii Special Administrative Zone who is primarily engaged in overseeing the Directorate's counterinsurgency campaign.
- Major General Sergei Sechin (Russian: Сергей Сечин), a Russian officer stationed in Beijing who passes on critical information about the Directorate's Cherenkov radiation detection system to the United States by coded references to Star Trek’s Pavel Chekov.
- Carrie Shin, a civilian who works at the Moana Surfrider Hotel in Waikiki Beach and goes on a personal vendetta by committing a series of increasingly gruesome murders of Chinese troops across occupied Honolulu since her fiancé was a Marine Corps fighter pilot who was killed during the invasion of Hawaii.

== Technology ==
The authors explicitly wrote Ghost Fleet with the goal of exploring how new technological developments might impact a future war. Technologies explored include electromagnetic railguns, swarm UAVs, optical head-mounted display glasses, space-based weaponry and performance-enhancing stimulants. The book includes over 400 endnotes.

== Reception ==
Ghost Fleet has been praised as a useful exploration of future conflict and has been recommended by leaders of the United States military as recommended reading for troops. Admiral James Stavridis called the book "A startling blueprint for the wars of the future and therefore needs to be read now!"

=== Attention from Indonesian ===
The then-Indonesian opposition leader Prabowo Subianto cited a detail in Ghost Fleet regarding Indonesia's hypothetical disintegration in 2030 because of a second Timorese conflict during a Great Indonesia Movement Party (Gerindra) assembly speech on 18 September 2017 and treated the novel as an academic study. A video clip of the speech was posted to Gerindra's official Facebook page on 18 March 2018, which subsequently attracted criticism and derision. Singer remarked on Twitter over Prabowo's enthusiasm on the book's particular detail: "There have been many unexpected twists and turns from this book experience, but this may take the cake."
