= Ilya Frank =

Soviet physicist (1908–1990)

- Илья Франк
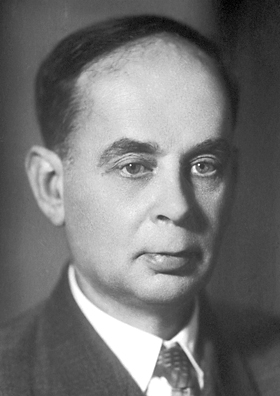
- Frank in 1958
- Born: Ilya Mikhailovich Frank; 23 October 1908; Saint Petersburg, Russian Empire
- Died: 22 June 1990 (aged 81); Moscow, Russian SFSR, Soviet Union
- Education: Moscow State University
- Known for: Cherenkov radiation Transition radiation Frank-Tamm formula
- Awards: Stalin Prize (1946); Nobel Prize in Physics (1958)
- Scientific career
- Fields: Nuclear physics
- Institutions: Moscow State University, Academy of Sciences of the USSR
- Doctoral advisor: Sergey Ivanovich Vavilov

Ilya Mikhailovich Frank (Russian: Илья Михайлович Франк; 23 October 1908 – 22 June 1990) was a Soviet physicist who received the 1958 Nobel Prize in Physics, jointly with Pavel Cherenkov and Igor Tamm, also of the Soviet Union. He received the award for his work in explaining the phenomenon of Cherenkov radiation. He received the Stalin prize in 1946 and 1953 and the USSR state prize in 1971.

== Life and career ==
Ilya Frank was born on 23 October 1908 in St. Petersburg. His father, Mikhail Lyudvigovich Frank, was a talented mathematician descended from a Jewish family, while his mother, Yelizaveta Mikhailovna Gratsianova, was a Russian Orthodox physician. His father participated in the student revolutionary movement, and as a result was expelled from Moscow University. After the October Revolution, he was reinstated and appointed professor. Ilya's uncle, Semyon Frank, a philosopher, was expelled from Soviet Russia in 1922 together with 160 other intellectuals. Ilya had one elder brother, Gleb Mikhailovich Frank, who became an eminent biophysicist and member of the Academy of Sciences of the USSR.

Ilya Frank studied mathematics and theoretical physics at Moscow State University. From his second year he worked in the laboratory of Sergey Ivanovich Vavilov, whom he regarded as his mentor. After graduating in 1930, on recommendation of Vavilov, he started working at the State Optical Institute in Leningrad. There he wrote his first publication—about luminescence— with Vavilov. The work he did there would form the basis of his doctoral dissertation in 1935.

In 1934, Frank moved to the Institute of Physics and Mathematics of the USSR Academy of Sciences (which shortly would be moved to Moscow, where it was transformed into the Institute of Physics). Here he started working on nuclear physics, a new field for him. He became interested in the effect discovered by Pavel Cherenkov, that charged particles moving through water at high speeds emit light. Together with Igor Tamm, he developed a theoretical explanation: the effect occurs when charged particles travel through an optically transparent medium at speeds greater than the speed of light in that medium, causing a shock wave in the electromagnetic field. The amount of energy radiated in this process is given by the Frank–Tamm formula.

The discovery and explanation of the effect resulted in the development of new methods for detecting and measuring the velocity of high-speed nuclear particles and became of great importance for research in nuclear physics. Cherenkov radiation is also widely used in biomedical research for detection of radioactive isotopes. In 1946, Cherenkov, Vavilov, Tamm, and Frank were awarded a Stalin Prize for their discovery, and 1958 Cherenkov, Tamm, and Frank received the Nobel Prize in Physics.

In 1944, Frank was appointed professor and became head of a department at the Institute of Physics and of the Nuclear Physics Laboratory (which was later transferred to the Institute of Nuclear Research). Frank's laboratory was involved in the (then secret) study of nuclear reactors. In particular, they studied the diffusion and thermalization of neutrons.

In 1957, Frank also become director of the Laboratory of Neutron Physics at the Joint Institute for Nuclear Research. The laboratory was based on the neutron fast-pulse reactor (IBR) then under construction at the site. Under Frank's supervision the reactor was used in the development of neutron spectroscopy techniques.

== Personal life and death ==
Frank married the noted historian, Ella Abramovna Beilikhis, in 1937. Their son, Alexander, was born in the same year, and would continue much of the studies of his father as a physicist.

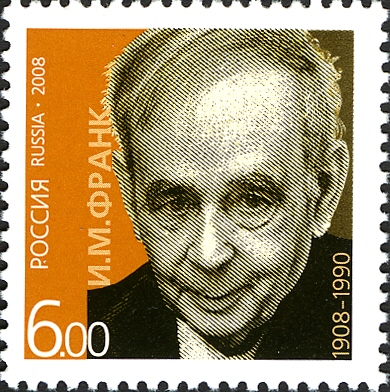
Image of Ilya Frank on a 2008 Russian stamp

Frank died on 22 June 1990 in Moscow at the age 81.

== See also ==
- List of Jewish Nobel laureates
