= George Adolphus Schott =

British mathematician and physicist (1868–1937)

George Augustus Schott
- Born: 25 January 1868; Bradford, England
- Died: 15 July 1937 (aged 69)
- Education: Trinity College, Cambridge
- Employer: Aberystwyth University

George Adolphus Schott (also referenced as George Augustus Schott) FRS (25 January 1868 – 15 July 1937) was a British mathematician and physicist. He is best known for developing the full theory of radiation from electrons travelling at close to the speed of light.

Born in Bradford to German parents, he was educated at Bradford Grammar School and later studied at Trinity College, Cambridge, receiving his Bachelor of Arts in 1890. After obtaining his Doctor of Science, he became an assistant lecturer to D.M. Lewis in the Department of Physics. After a year's leave, in which he travelled to Germany, he became a lecturer of Applied Mathematics at Aberystwyth University, where he would spend the rest of his career. In 1910, he became Chair of the Applied Mathematics department and vice-president of the college.

During Schott's early years at Aberystwyth, he published his classical work on electromagnetic radiation, following the work laid down by Alfred-Marie Liénard. It was not until 1947 that the blue light observed near synchrotron particle accelerators, called 'synchrotron radiation', was recognised as the radiation Schott predicted. In 1909, he was awarded the Adams Prize and in 1922 became a Fellow of the Royal Society.

Schott remained among the last respectable 'anti-quantum' scientists, opposing the quantum formalism introduced by Niels Bohr. In 1933, he published the nonradiation condition of a wobbling charged sphere.

== Published works of note ==
- On the Reflexion and Refraction of Light (1894)
- Electromagnetic radiation: And the mechanical reactions arising from it (1912)
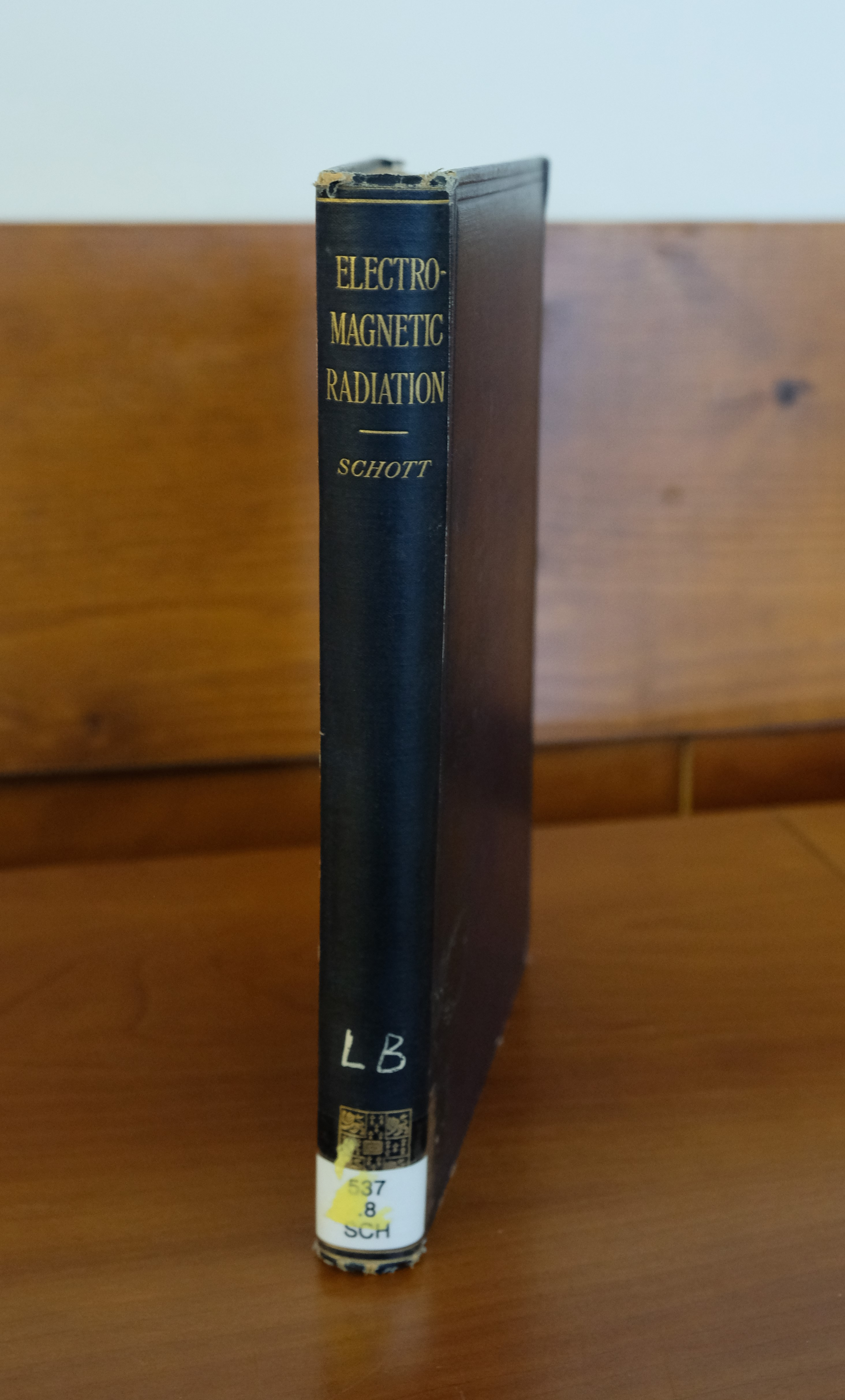
Electromagnetic Radiation and the mechanical reactions arising from it (1912)

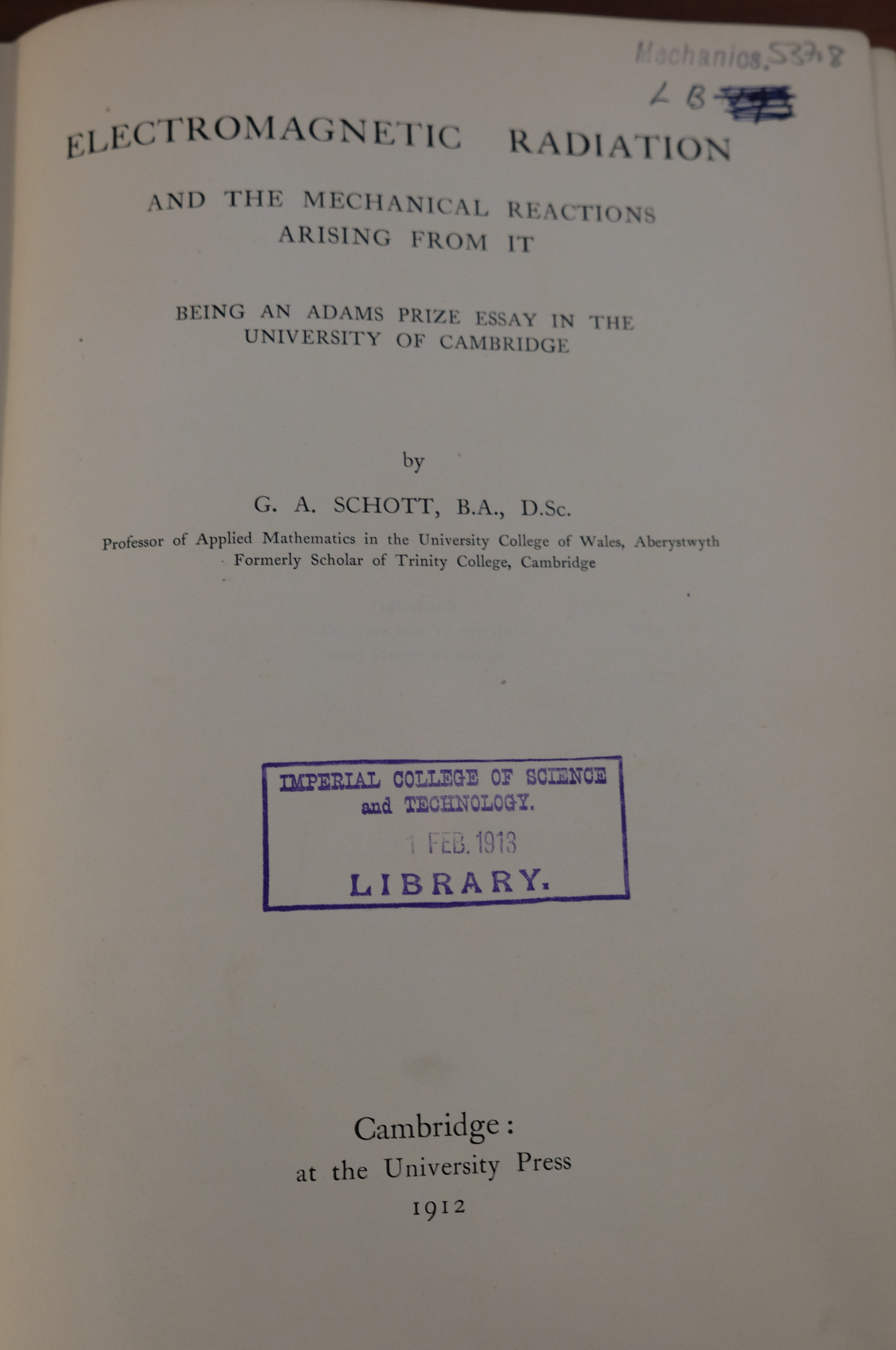
Title page to Electromagnetic Radiation and the mechanical reactions arising from it (1912)

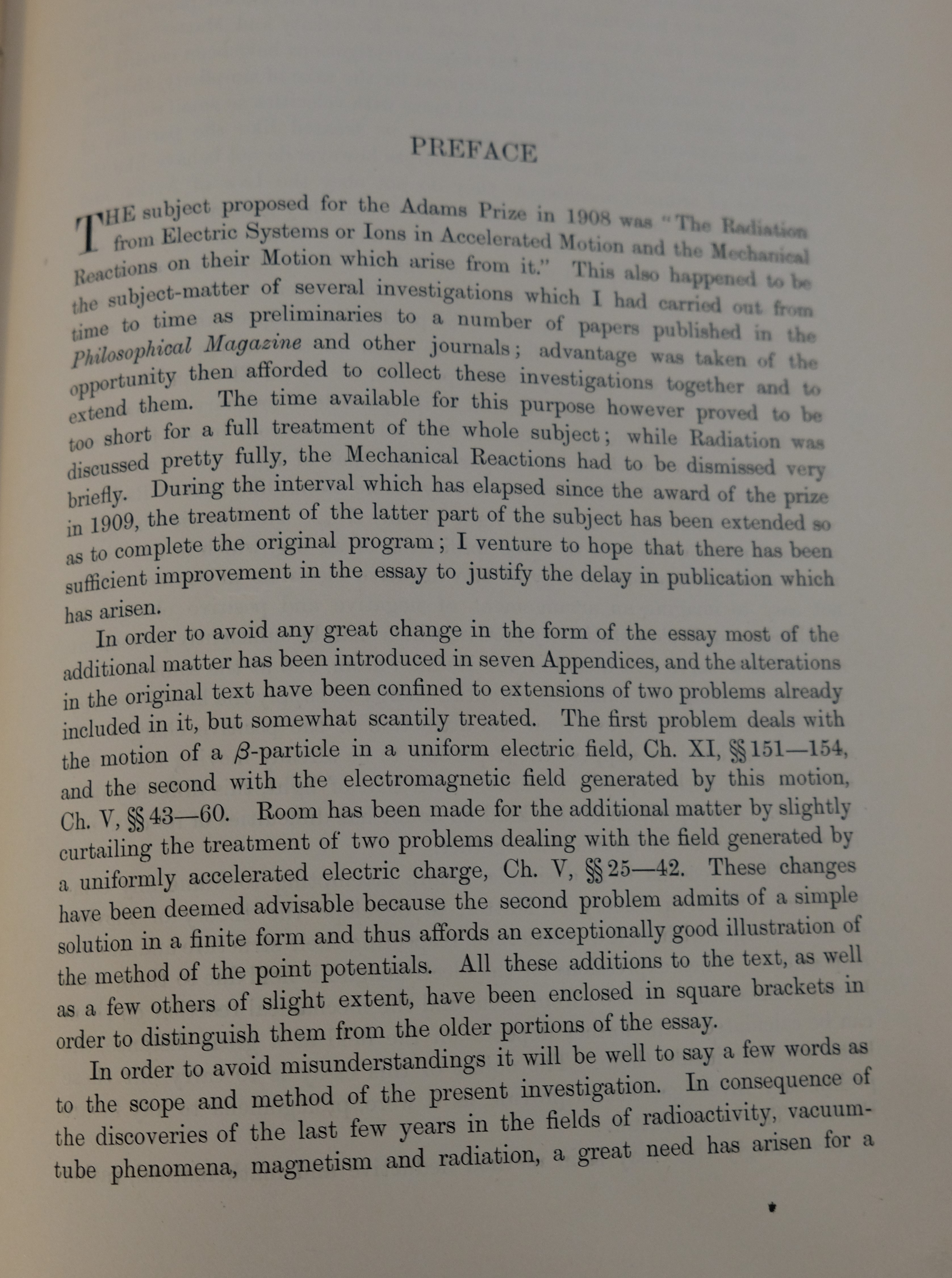
Preface to Electromagnetic Radiation and the mechanical reactions arising from it (1912)

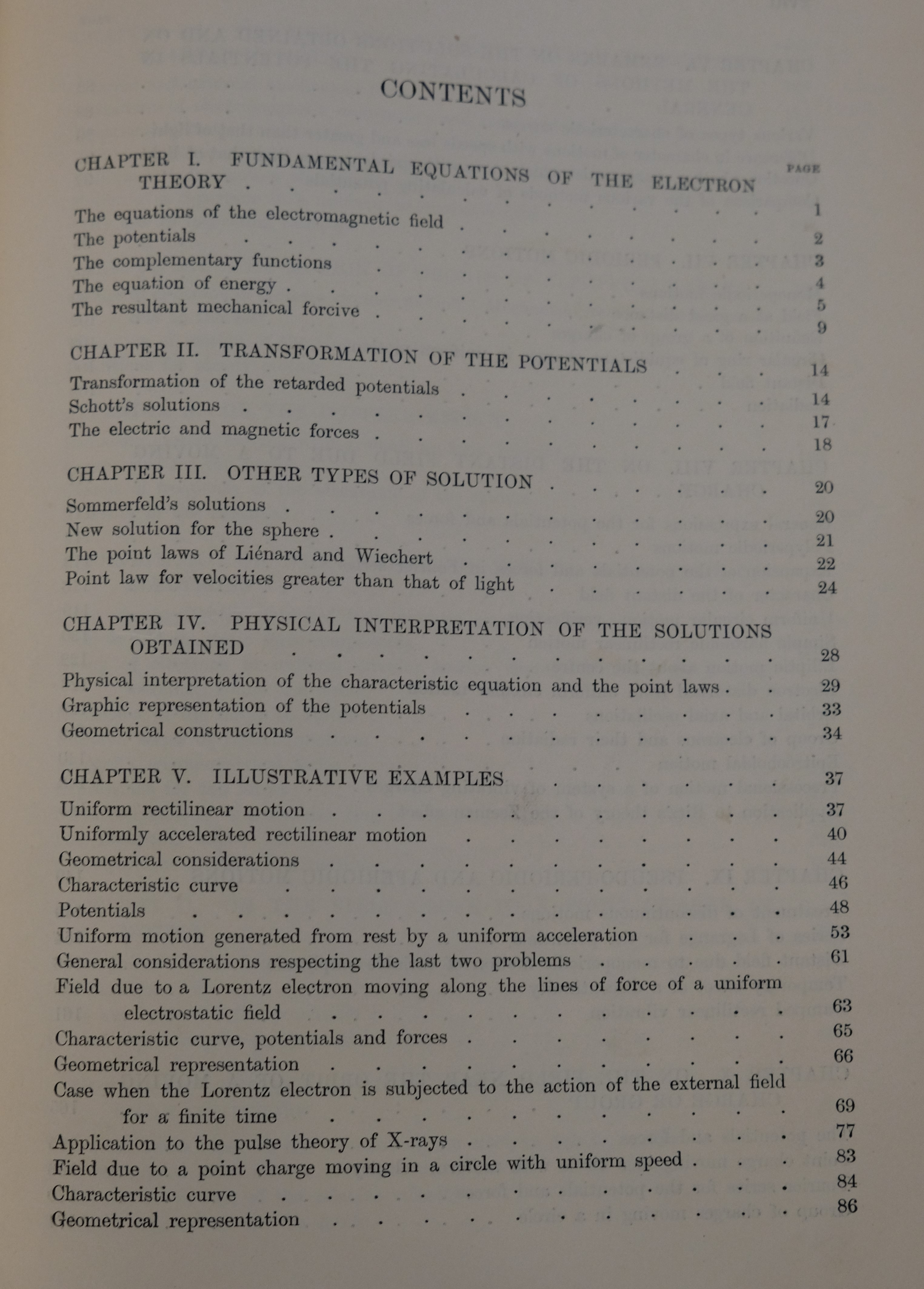
Table of contents to Electromagnetic Radiation and the mechanical reactions arising from it (1912)

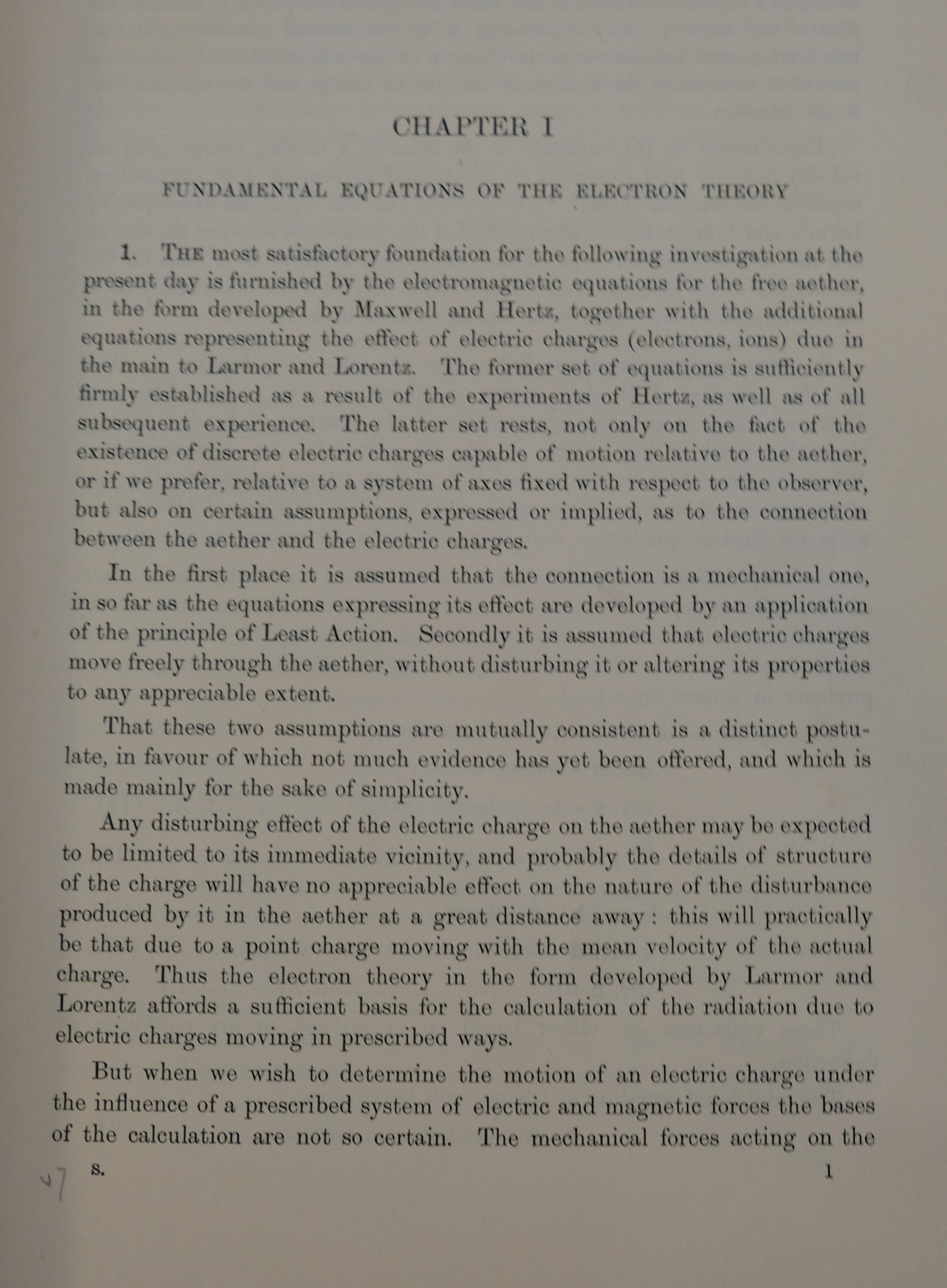
First page of Electromagnetic Radiation and the mechanical reactions arising from it (1912)
