= International Schools Group =

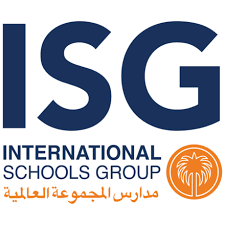

Location
- Al Maha, Al Khobar; 34726; Saudi Arabia; 26.1879°N 50.12845°E

Information
- Former name: Saudi Arabian International Schools (SAIS)
- Motto: We Inspire Innovation and Compassionate Action
- Established: 1962
- Superintendent: Rhonda Norris
- Campuses: ASD, BSD, Sara Village School, ISG Dammam, ISG Jubail
- Campus size: 70,000 m^{2} (750,000 sq ft)
- Website: isg.edu.sa

International Schools Group (ISG), formerly Saudi Arabian International Schools (SAIS), operates five individual schools in Saudi Arabia: American School Dhahran (ASD), British School Dhahran (BSD), ISG Dammam, ISG Jubail and Sara Village School (SVS). Two schools offer the National Curriculum for England (British School Dhahran and Sara Village School), while the others offer an American curriculum. The school is designed to provide the best quality education in the Eastern Province, with students exceeding global expectations and standards.

== History ==
The International Schools Group (ISG) is a not-for-profit organization that operates a network of international schools primarily serving expatriate and local communities in the Kingdom of Saudi Arabia. Established in 1962, for the staffs of US Consulate, Dhahran. The organization started with a single school to cater to the growing educational needs of the expatriate population. Over the decades, ISG expanded to operate multiple campuses in key cities such as Al Khobar, Dammam and Jubail. It has become one of the most prominent international school groups in the region, providing diverse curriculum, including the American, British, and International Baccalaureate (IB) programs. All ISG schools are accredited by the Middle States Association of Colleges and Schools (MSA) through December 2024 [1]

== Campuses ==
ISG operates several campuses across Saudi Arabia, including:

•American School Dhahran (ASD)- This American-curriculum high school provides advanced placement (AP) courses and IBDP and prepares students for higher education globally. [3]

• British School Dhahran (BSD) - Following the British curriculum, BSD serves students aged 3 to 18 and offers IGCSEs and A-Levels. [2]

•ISG Dammam - A multicultural campus offering a combination of American and international curricula to students in the eastern coastal city of Dammam.[5]

•ISG Jubail - A multicultural campus offering a combination of American and international curricula to students in the industrial city of Jubail. Students have the option to choose the International Baccalaureate Diploma Program, or its courses. K-10 is an American based curriculum. [4]

•Sara Village School - A small community-oriented school that serves younger learners and focuses on foundational education.[6]

== Curriculum ==
The academic programs at ISG are designed to exceed international education standards. Schools within the district follow either the American or British systems, depending on the campus:

American Curriculum: This system, primarily offered at the American School Dhahran (ASD), ISG Dammam and ISG Jubail, follows Common Core and Advanced Placement (AP) standards.

British Curriculum: Schools such as British School Dhahran (BSD) and Sara Village School (SVS) adhere to the National Curriculum for England, preparing students for IGCSE and A-Level exams.

IBDP: Offered to students at the American School of Dhahran and ISG Jubail campuses.

== Accreditation and Affiliations ==
All ISG schools are accredited by international bodies such as:

Council of International Schools (CIS) Middle States Association of Colleges and Schools (MSA) British Schools Overseas (BSO) for campuses following the British curriculum. The schools are also members of global education networks such as the Near East South Asia Council of Overseas Schools (NESA) and the International Baccalaureate (IB), although not all campuses offer IB programs.

== Community and Student Body ==
The ISG student body is diverse, with students hailing from more than 60 different countries. The group primarily serves expatriate families, including those working in the oil and gas industry, as well as families from US diplomatic staffs and international business communities.

== See also ==
- List of schools in Saudi Arabia
- Americans living in Saudi Arabia
