= University of Massachusetts Lowell Radiation Laboratory =

Laboratory in Lowell, Massachusetts

UMLRR
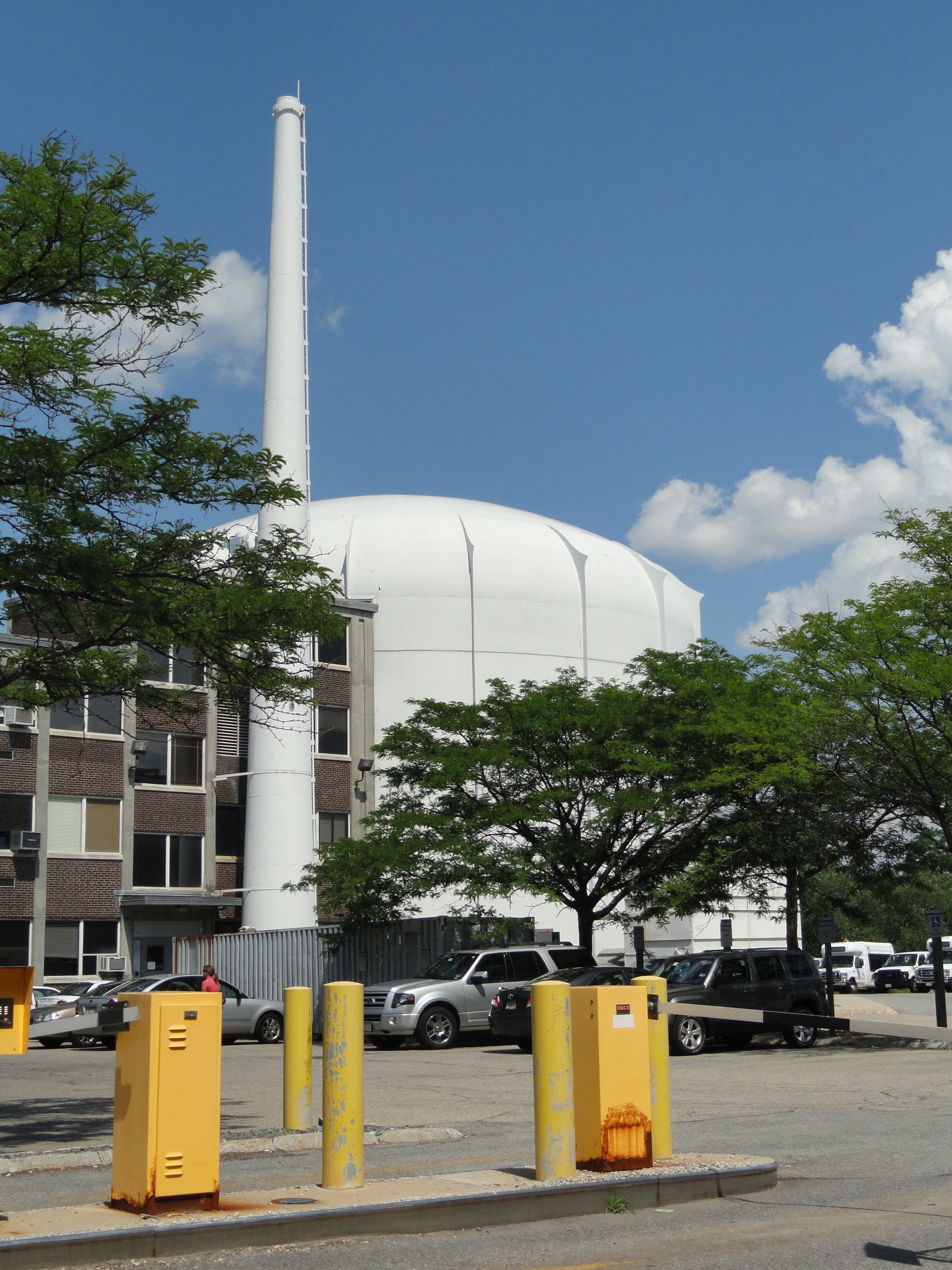

- Location within Massachusetts
- Operating institution: University of Massachusetts Lowell
- Location: Lowell, Massachusetts
- Coordinates: 42°39′17″N 71°19′30″W
- Type: Pool
- Power: 860420650 cal(th)/h

Construction and upkeep
- Construction cost: $1.2 million USD
- Construction began: 1974
- First criticality: 1975 January 2
- Annual upkeep cost: $0.3 million USD
- Staff: 2
- Operators: 6

Technical specifications
- Max thermal flux: 1.4e13 n/cm^2-s
- Max fast flux: 9.2e12 n/cm^2-s
- Cooling: light water
- Neutron moderator: light water
- Neutron reflector: graphite, light water
- Control rods: Boron-Aluminium-Carbide (Boral); 4 per element
- Cladding material: aluminium alloy

The Radiation Laboratory at the University of Massachusetts Lowell serves the Department of Applied Physics among others. The laboratory contains the University of Massachusetts Lowell Research Reactor (UMLRR), a 1 MW pool-type research reactor that has been operating since 1974, along with Co-60 gamma ray sources and a 5.5 MeV Van de Graaff accelerator.

== Reactor ==
The first startup was on January 2, 1975. A budget for the reactor is not provided by the university or the state; funding comes from customer irradiations, grants, and the United States Department of Energy.

=== Conversion to LEU ===
The UMass Lowell reactor has been one of the many research reactors to make the conversion from high-enriched uranium (HEU) to low-enriched uranium (LEU) as a part of anti-terrorism security measures. The used HEU fuel was reportedly shipped to the Savannah River Site. The original shipping date was June 2002 but had been postponed many times. As of present-day the shipments have been made and the reactor is in operation with LEU.

=== Neutron Irradiation Capabilities ===
Neutron irradiation facilities at the UMLRR include: 1x 8-inch beam port, 2x 6-inch beam ports, in-core radiation baskets & flux trap, thermal column, and fast neutron irradiator (FNI).
