= Novaya Chigla =

Novaya Chigla Новая Чигла
- Selo
- Location within Voronezh Oblast Location within Russia
- Coordinates: 51°13′N 40°28′E
- Country: Russia
- Region: Voronezh Oblast
- District: Talovsky District
- Time zone: UTC+3:00

Novaya Chigla (Russian: Новая Чигла) is a rural locality (a selo) and the administrative center of Novochigolskoye Rural Settlement, Talovsky District, Voronezh Oblast, Russia. The population was 2,474 as of 2010. There are 42 streets.

== Geography ==
Novaya Chigla is located 30 km west of Talovaya (the district's administrative centre) by road. Staraya Chigla is the nearest rural locality.
