= Photo-meson =

Meson ejected from an atomic nucleus by a high energy photon

In high-energy astrophysics, a photo-meson is a meson (most often a pion) produced in the interaction of a photon with a nucleon within an astrophysical object. This interaction is commonly referred to as photo-hadronic process. The decay of charged mesons ultimately results in the production of neutrinos and electrons, with muons as an intermediate state. The decay of neutral mesons produces high-energy gamma-rays. Photo-meson production is one of the hadronic processes that can occur in cosmic ray sources as gamma-ray bursts and active galactic nuclei, and that can result in an observable multi-messenger signature.
