= Fear (disambiguation) =

Fear is an emotion that arises from the perception of danger.

Fear or The Fear may also refer to:

== People ==
- "Fear", an alias of Mikael Åkerfeldt's on The Human Equation
- "Fear", the online alias of the professional Dota 2 player Clinton Loomis
- "Fear", the lead guitarist of Mexican punk rock band Allison

== Arts and entertainment ==
=== Fictional entities ===
- Fear, the personification of fear in the 2015 film Inside Out
- Fear, a villain in the R. L. Stine's The Haunting Hour episode "Fear Never Knocks"
- The Fear, a character from Metal Gear Solid 3: Snake Eater

=== Film ===
- Fear (1917 film), a German film directed by Robert Wiene
- Fear (1946 film), directed by Alfred Zeisler
- Fear (1954 film) by Roberto Rossellini starring Ingrid Bergman
- Fear, a 1965 short Hindi film directed by Ritwik Ghatak
- Fear (1988 film), an action film featuring Cliff DeYoung
- Fear (1990 film), a thriller/horror film starring Ally Sheedy
- Fear (1996 film), starring Mark Wahlberg and Reese Witherspoon
- Fear (2007 film), a horror film directed by Vikram Bhatt
- Fear (2020 film), a Bulgarian film
- Fear (2023 film), a horror film directed by Deon Taylor
- Fear (2024 film), a thriller by Haritha Gogineni
- Le Fear, a 2010 British comedy
- The Fear (1966 film), a Greek crime drama
- The Fear (1995 film), an American horror film starring Vince Edwards
- The Fear (2015 film), a French film

=== Gaming ===
- F.E.A.R. (series), a series of psychological horror video games
  - F.E.A.R. (video game) (First Encounter Assault Recon), a 2005 first-person shooter video game

=== Literature ===
- Fear (Abbot novel), 2006, by Jeff Abbott
- Fear (anthology), a 2010 book edited by R. L. Stine
- Fear (comics), a comic book series published by Marvel Comics from 1970 to 1975
- Fear (Hubbard novella), 1940, by L. Ron Hubbard
- Fear (Rybakov novel), 1990, by Anatoly Rybakov
- Fear (Zweig novella), 1925, by Stefan Zweig
- Fear: Anti-Semitism in Poland after Auschwitz, a 2006 book by Jan T. Gross
- Fear: Trump in the White House, a 2018 non-fiction book by Bob Woodward
- The Fear (Higson novel), a 2011 novel in The Enemy series by Charlie Higson
- The Fear (Keneally novel), 1965, by Thomas Keneally
- Fear (2019 play), by Matt Williams
- Fear (radio play), 1930, by Ruth Bedford

=== Music ===
==== Albums ====
- Fear (John Cale album), 1974
- Fear (Royal Hunt album), 1999
- Fear (Toad the Wet Sprocket album), 1991
- The Fear (album), by Acid Reign, 1989
- Fuck Everyone and Run (F E A R), by Marillion, 2016

==== Extended plays ====
- Fear (EP), by NF, 2025
- Fear, a 1987 EP by Klinik
- The Fear, a 1999 EP by Mike Paradinas

==== Songs ====
- "Fear" (Kendrick Lamar song), 2017
- "Fear" (Seventeen song), 2019
- "Fear" (NF song), 2025
- "F.E.A.R." (song), by Ian Brown, 2001
- "Fear (of the Unknown)", by Siouxsie and the Banshees, 1991
- "The Fear" (Ben Howard song), 2011
- "The Fear" (Lily Allen song), 2008
- "Fear", by All Saints from Red Flag
- "Fear", by Axenstar from Where Dreams Are Forgotten
- "Fear", by Blue October from Sway
- "Fear", by Disturbed from The Sickness
- "Fear", by Ed Sheeran from -
- "Fear", by James from The Morning After
- "Fear", by Jim Martin from Milk and Blood
- "Fear", by Lenny Kravitz from Let Love Rule
- "Fear", by Linkin Park from LP Underground 9: Demos
- "Fear", by Low from I Could Live in Hope
- "Fear", by Mudvayne from Kill, I Oughtta
- "Fear", by Oceansize from Leader of the Starry Skies: A Tribute to Tim Smith, Songbook 1
- "Fear", by OneRepublic from Waking Up
- "Fear", by Paradise Lost from Draconian Times
- "Fear", by Primal Fear from Black Sun
- "Fear", by Sarah McLachlan from Fumbling Towards Ecstasy
- "Fear", by Sevendust from Chapter VII: Hope & Sorrow
- "Fear", by Sia from Healing Is Difficult
- "Fear", by Spratleys Japs from Pony
- "Fear", by Varials from In Darkness
- "Fear", by The Ventures from The Ventures in Space
- "Fear", by X Ambassadors from VHS
- "The Fear", by The Feelers from Playground Battle
- "The Fear", by The Levellers from Zeitgeist
- "The Fear", by Pulp from This Is Hardcore
- "The Fear", by Röyksopp from Senior
- "The Fear", by The Shins from Heartworms
- "The Fear", by Travis from The Man Who
- "The Fear", by Trust Company from The Lonely Position of Neutral
- "The Fear", by Death Grips from Year of the Snitch, 2018
- "The Fear", by GUM from The Underdog
- "Fear Song", by Anirudh Ravichander from the 2024 Indian film Devara: Part 1
- Fear, a 1984–2002 set of four songs by Rush

==== Performers ====
- Fear (band), an American punk band formed in 1977 in Los Angeles

=== Television ===
- Fear (American TV series), an American paranormal reality television series
- Fear (2025 TV series), a British television series
- The Fear (1988 TV series), a UK crime drama
- The Fear, a 2001 UK television series featuring Anna Friel
- The Fear (2012 TV series), a British drama series
- "The Fear" (The Twilight Zone), a 1964 episode
- "Fear (Of the Unknown)" (Grey's Anatomy), an episode

== Other uses ==
- Fear (surname), list of people with the name
- FEAR (terrorist group), a 2011–2012 American right-wing terrorist group
- Fear (yacht), wheelchair-adapted yacht sailed by Jazz Turner
- Forfeiture Endangers American Rights, or FEAR, an American activist group opposed to asset forfeiture

== See also ==
- F.E.A.R. (disambiguation)
- Cape Fear (disambiguation)
- Fears (album), 1997, by Atrophia Red Sun
- "Fears" (Modern Family), an episode of the American sitcom Modern Family
- Fears (surname)
- Fears (video game), a 1995 first-person-shooter game
