= Fear (surname) =

Fear is a surname. Notable people with the surname include:

- Albert Fear (1907–2000), Welsh rugby player
- Arthur Fear (1902–1984), Welsh opera singer
- Elise Fear, Canadian microwave engineer
- Ernest Fear (1903–1982), British sports shooter
- Harold Fear (1908–1943), British cricket player
- Jackson Fear (1978–2006), Canadian archer
- Jennifer Fear, British charity administrator
- Keith Fear (born 1952), English footballer
- Lilah Fear (born 1999), British-Canadian ice dancer, sister of Sasha
- Nicola Fear, British epidemiologist
- Peter Fear (born 1973), English footballer
- Sasha Fear (born 2002), British ice dancer, sister of Lilah
- Sue Fear (1963–2006), Australian mountaineer
- Tanya Fear (born 1989–1990), British actress and comedian
- Tracey Fear (born 1959), New Zealand netball player
- Vern Fear (1925–1976), American baseball player

== See also ==
- Captain Fear, pirate mascot of US football team. the Tampa Bay Buccaneers
- Freddie Fear, fictional British comic strip character
- Mister Fear, four Marvel comic supervillains
- Fears (surname)
