= MetOp-SG B1 =

European weather satellite

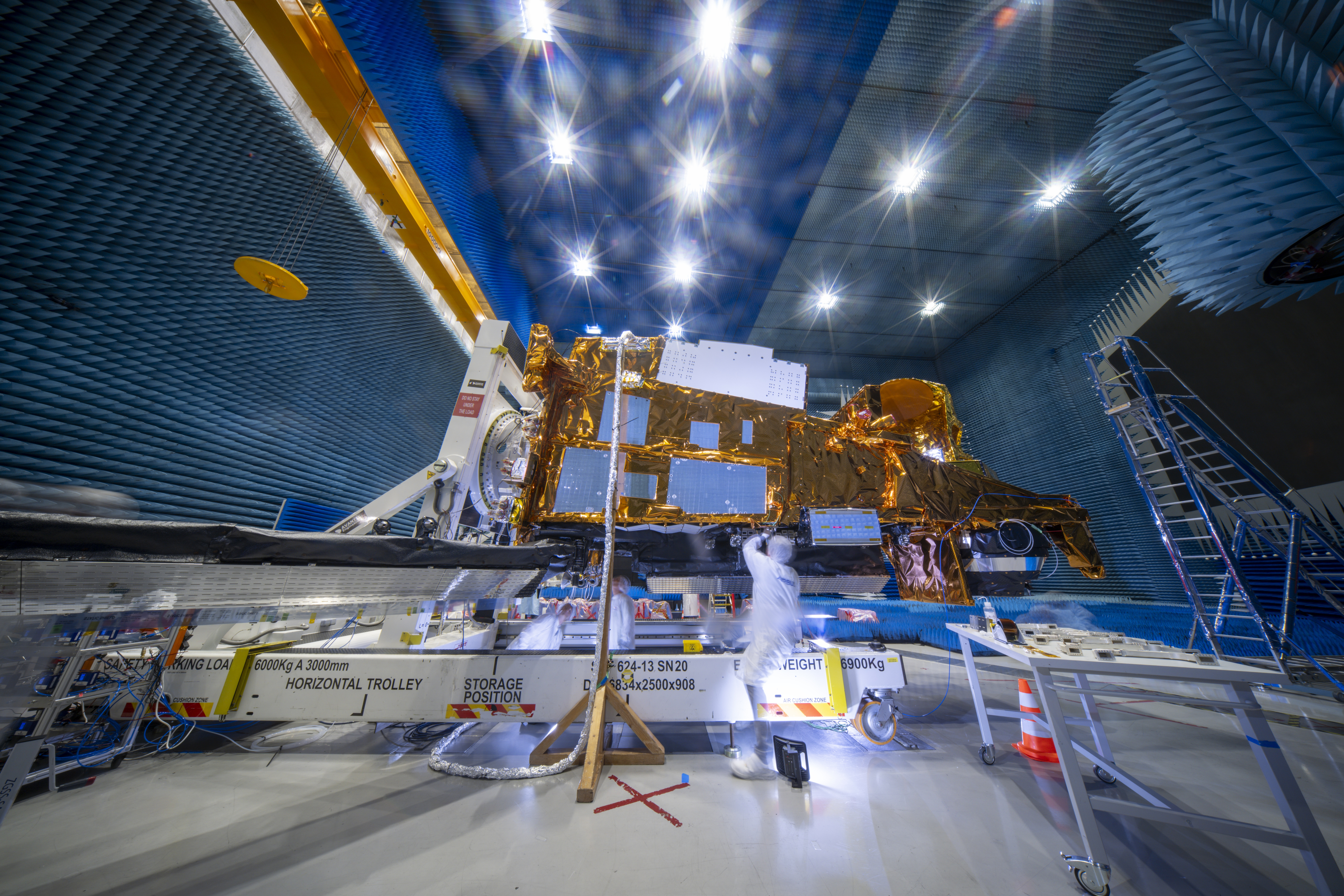
- Mission type: Meteorology
- Operator: ESA, EUMETSAT

Spacecraft properties
- Manufacturer: Airbus Defence and Space

Start of mission
- Launch date: 2026 (planned)
- Rocket: Ariane 62
- Launch site: ELA-4
- Contractor: Arianespace

Orbital parameters
- Reference system: Geocentric
- Regime: Sun-synchronous
- Altitude: 824 km
- Inclination: 98.7 deg
- Period: 101.4 minutes
- Repeat interval: 29 days

MetOp-SG B1 is a future European weather satellite, the first of the microwave imaging-focused B-type of the MetOp-SG series. It carries five instruments: a scatterometer for observing ocean-surface wind and soil moisture (SCA), a radio occultation sounder to measure atmospheric temperature and humidity (RO), a microwave imager to monitor precipitation and sea-ice extent (MWI), an ice cloud imager to measure water in clouds (ICI), and an Argos-4 data collection system (A-DCS). Its single solar panel wing is 11 m long with surface of 24 square meters and consists of four segments. The satellite is expected to launch in 2026 on Ariane 62 as the second satellite of the MetOp-SG series after MetOp-SG A1/Sentinel-5A launched in August 2025.
