= Maria Stuchly =

Polish-Canadian microwave engineer

Maria A. Stuchly (née Rzepecka, 1939–2022) was a Polish and Canadian electrical engineer specializing in the interactions of microwaves with the human body.

== Early life in Poland ==
Maria Rzepecka was born on April 8, 1939 in Warsaw; her father, a lawyer and economist, died soon afterward in World War II. Her mother was active in the Polish resistance movement in World War II, and after the failure of the Warsaw Uprising they were separated in German internment camps until the end of the war. Her interest in science and technology was inspired by a high school teacher physics teacher at her girls' school, who had been relegated to high school teaching instead of at a university for political reasons. She went on to the Warsaw University of Technology, where she received a master's degree in electronics engineering in 1962.

She began doctoral studies at the Warsaw University of Technology, but after two years moved to the Polish Industrial Research Institute, in its Microwave Research Division. After beginning a relationship with her future husband, Stan Stuchly, who also worked at the institute, she moved to the Institute of Physics of the Polish Academy of Sciences to avoid a conflict of interest. Stan Stuchly began a postdoctorate at the University of Manitoba in 1969; Rzepecka remained in Poland, completing her Ph.D. through the Polish Academy of Sciences in 1970.

== Later life in Canada ==
Instead of obtaining permission to rejoin Stan Stuchly through the Polish government, Rzepecka defected while traveling to a conference in the Netherlands. After a month in the Netherlands, her Canadian visa was approved, and she began her own postdoctoral research in Manitoba. After marrying Stan Stuchly, in 1972, she changed her name to Rzepecka-Stuchly for one publication in 1976, and then to Stuchly.

At the University of Manitoba, Stuchly worked on agricultural applications of microwaves in food drying, working for four years as a research associate and adjunct faculty member after her postdoctorate finished. She moved in 1976 to the Bureau of Radiation and Medical Devices of Health and Welfare Canada, working for them as a research scientist and beginning there a new focus on the interactions of microwaves with the human body. Meanwhile, her husband had moved to the University of Ottawa, with which she also held an affiliation as an adjunct faculty member.

In 1992, Stuchly and her husband both moved to the University of Victoria, with her husband chairing the Department of Electrical and Computer Engineering while she was offered only a 5-year visiting professor position. She was given a full professorship and an Industrial Research Chair there in 1994, and in 1996 was elected vice president of the International Union of Radio Science, its first woman in this office. She did not have many doctoral students at Victoria, but notable among them was Elise Fear, who worked with Stuchly on the use of microwave imaging for the diagnosis of breast cancer.

She retired in 2005 as a professor emerita, and died in Vancouver on August 15, 2022.

== Recognition ==
Stuchly became an IEEE Fellow, in the 1991 class of fellows, "for contributions to the understanding of interactions of electromagnetic fields with biological systems, and the development of effective protection standards".

In 2024, microwave engineer Susan Hagness of the University of Wisconsin–Madison received a Wisconsin Alumni Research Foundation (WARF) Named Professorship, which she chose to name after Stuchly, becoming the Maria Stuchly Professor of Electrical Engineering.

== Selected publications ==
- Rzepecka, Maria A. (January 1973), "A cavity perturbation method for routine permittivity measurement", Journal of Microwave Power, 8 (1): 3–11, Bibcode:1973JMPow...8....3R, doi:10.1080/00222739.1973.11689015
- Stuchly, Maria A. (March 1979), "Interaction of radiofrequency and microwave radiation with living systems: A review of mechanisms", Radiation and Environmental Biophysics, 16 (1): 1–14, Bibcode:1979REBio..16....1S, doi:10.1007/bf01326892, PMID 382232
- Stuchly, Maria A.; Stuchly, Stanislaw S. (1980), "Coaxial line reflection methods for measuring dielectric properties of biological substances at radio and microwave frequencies – a review", IEEE Transactions on Instrumentation and Measurement, 29 (3): 176–183, doi:10.1109/tim.1980.4314902
- Okoniewski, M.; Stuchly, M.A. (1996), "A study of the handset antenna and human body interaction", IEEE Transactions on Microwave Theory and Techniques, 44 (10): 1855–1864, Bibcode:1996ITMTT..44.1855O, doi:10.1109/22.539944
- Fear, E. C.; Li, X.; Hagness, S. C.; Stuchly, M. A. (August 2002), "Confocal microwave imaging for breast cancer detection: localization of tumors in three dimensions", IEEE Transactions on Biomedical Engineering, 49 (8): 812–822, Bibcode:2002ITBE...49..812F, doi:10.1109/tbme.2002.800759, PMID 12148820
