= MetOp-SG =

European meteorological satellites

Meteorological Operational Satellite – Second Generation
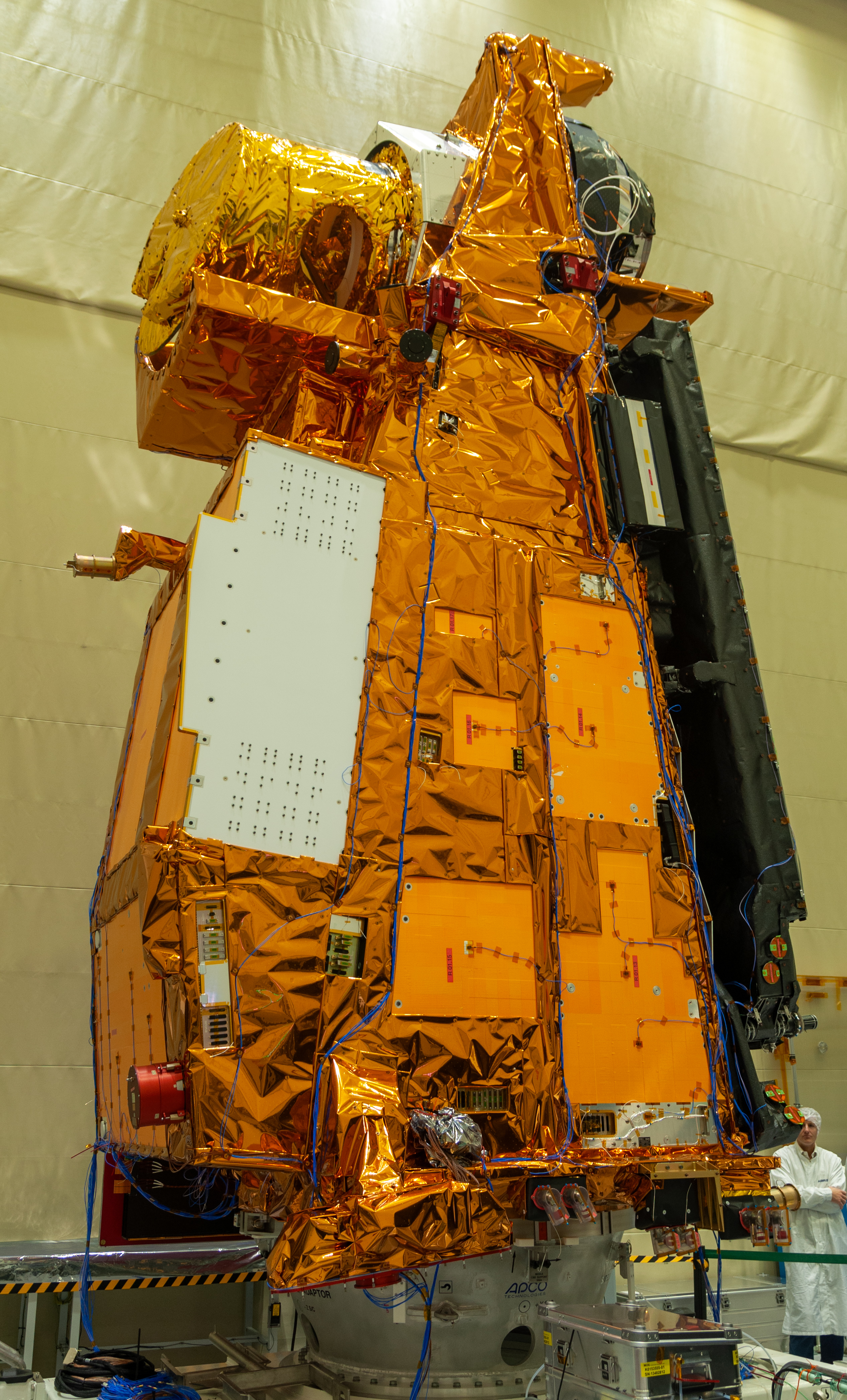
- MetOp-SG B1 Satellite Before Launch
- Manufacturer: Airbus Defence and Space
- Designer: European Space Agency
- Country of origin: European Union
- Operator: EUMETSAT
- Applications: Meteorology

Specifications
- Spacecraft type: Satellite
- Bus: Astrobus
- Launch mass: ~4 tonnes
- Regime: 831 km Sun-synchronous orbit
- Design life: 7.5 years

Production
- Status: First satellite launched in 2025
- On order: 6
- Built: 2
- Launched: 1

MetOp-SG (Meteorological Operational Satellite – Second Generation) is a series of six meteorological satellites developed by European Space Agency and EUMETSAT to be launched from 2025 to 2039.

== Development ==
In May 2014 during the ILA Berlin Air Show, in the presence of German chancellor Angela Merkel, ESA, EUMETSAT and Airbus Defence and Space signed the first documents for the development of the second generation of MetOp satellites. On 16 October 2014 a contract was signed with Airbus Defence and Space for the construction of the satellites, worth €1.3 billion in total for six spacecraft (on average €266.7 million each). In December 2014 additional contracts were signed for Ice Cloud Imagers to be used on the B-series satellites and three microwave sounder instruments.

== Satellites ==
MetOp-SG satellites are being built in two series: A, carrying visible, infrared, and microwave imagers and sounders; and B, carrying microwave imagers and radars. The first A-series satellite (MetOp-SG A1/Sentinel-5A) was launched on Ariane 6 on 12 August 2025, and the Launch and Early Orbit Phase (LEOP) of commissioning was successfully completed 3 days later. The first B-series satellite (MetOp-SG B1) is set to launch in 2026, also using the Ariane 6 rocket.

== MetOp Second Generation A instruments ==
- Infrared Atmospheric Sounding Interferometer –New Generation: A passive infrared sounder that will measure parameters such as temperature and humidity profiles, clouds, greenhouse gases, aerosols, and trace gases in the Earth’s atmosphere.
- Microwave Sounder: A total power microwave sounder that will deliver calibrated and geolocated atmospheric temperature and water vapour sounding data under all weather conditions.
- Visible and Infrared Imager (METimage): A multi-spectral optical and short wave infrared imager that will provide observations of the Earth’s outgoing radiation for meteorological and climate applications.
- Radio Occultation Sounder: An atmospheric sounder that will provide temperature and humidity profiles in all weather conditions with high accuracy and provide ionospheric measurements for space weather applications.
- Multi-Viewing, Multi-Channel, Multi-Polarisation Imager: An optical imager with a wide field of view, whose objectives are to provide atmospheric aerosol and cloud imagery for climate monitoring, air quality forecasts and numerical weather prediction.
- Copernicus Sentinel-5/Ultraviolet, Visible, Near-Infrared and Short Wave Infrared Sounder: An ultraviolet visible near-infrared shortwave spectrometer, valuable for monitoring gas concentrations and air quality of the atmosphere.
- Radiation Monitoring Unit (RMU), ESA hosted instrument (also called NGRM) to measure the radiation environment. ESA conduct the data calibration and production, rather than EUMETSAT as this is not a weather instrument.

== MetOp Second Generation B instruments ==
- Scatterometer: A real-aperture pulsed imaging radar that will provide measurements relevant for measuring sea surface roughness, which correlates closely with wind speed and direction over the ocean, and soil moisture.
- Radio Occultation Sounder
- Microwave Imager: A microwave imager that will provide data on precipitation, temperature, cloud, water vapour, sea ice, and snow cover.
- Ice Cloud Imager: A short microwave imager that will enrich global observations of ice clouds, such as cirriform clouds.
- Argos-4: The satellite element of an advanced data collection system dedicated to oceanography and wildlife

== Operations ==
MetOp-SG satellites are a follow on from the three MetOp satellites and therefore a short tandem mission was performed from April to June 2026 between the MetOp-SG-A1 and MetOp-C satellites to cross calibrate old and new instruments. A tandem mission will also be flown between MetOp-SG-A1 and the FORUM satellite in the future.
