= Lucille Lortel Theatre =

Off-Broadway theater in New York City

- Theatre de Lys
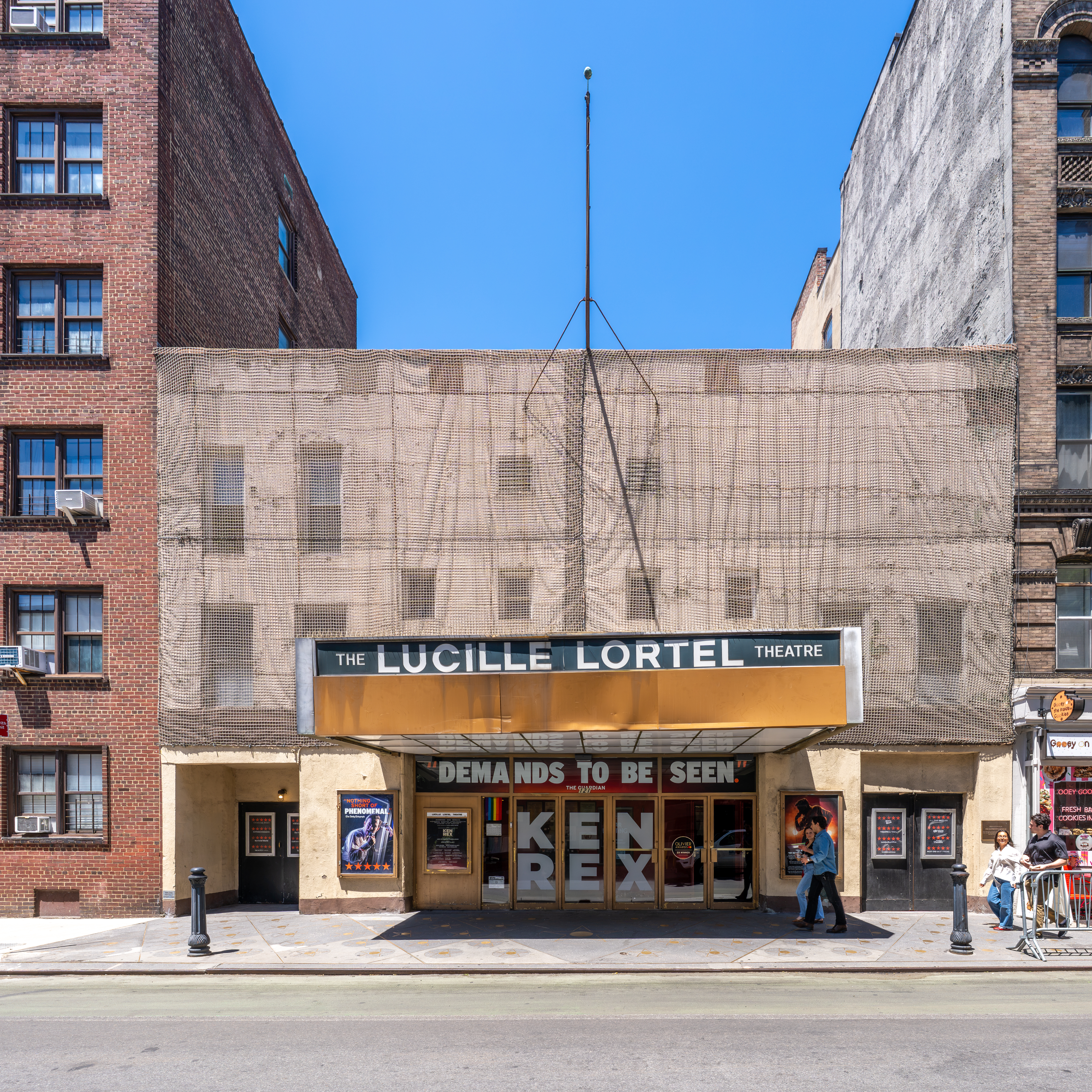
- (2026)
- Interactive map of Lucille Lortel Theatre
- Address: 121 Christopher Street; Manhattan, New York; United States
- Coordinates: 40°44′00″N 74°00′21″W
- Owner: Lucille Lortel Foundation
- Capacity: 299
- Type: proscenium
- Public transit: Christopher Street–Stonewall, West Fourth Street–Washington Square

Construction
- Opened: June 9, 1953

Website
- www.lortel.org/Theatre/History

The Lucille Lortel Theatre is an Off-Broadway playhouse at 121 Christopher Street in Manhattan's West Village. It was built in 1926 as a 590-seat movie theater called the New Hudson, later known as Hudson Playhouse. The interior design is largely unchanged, though as of 2024 it had 295 seats.

In the early 1950s, the site was converted to an Off-Broadway theater as Theatre de Lys, opening on June 9, 1953, with a production of Maya, a play by Simon Gantillon starring Kay Medford, Vivian Matalon, and Susan Strasberg. It closed after seven performances. Much more successful was The Threepenny Opera which opened March 10, 1954, with a cast that included Bea Arthur, John Astin, Lotte Lenya, Leon Lishner, Scott Merrill, Gerald Price, Charlotte Rae and Jo Sullivan. Because of an incoming booking, it was forced to close after 96 performances. Re-opening September 20, 1955, with largely the same cast, The Threepenny Opera this time played until December 17, 1961, a then record-setting run for a musical in New York City.

In 1955, financier Louis Schweitzer acquired the building as an anniversary present for his wife, actress-producer Lucille Lortel. In 1981, the year of her 81st birthday, the theatre was renamed in her honor. After Lortel's death in April 1999, she left the theatre to the Lucille Lortel Foundation.

== Timeline of productions ==
- 1953: Maya
- 1953: The Scarecrow
- 1953: The School for Scandal
- 1953: The Little Clay Cart
- 1953: Little Red Riding Hood
- 1953: End as a Man
- 1953: The Knight of the Burning Pestle
- 1953: Moon in Capricorn
- 1954: Bullfight
- 1954: The Threepenny Opera
- 1955: The Immortal Husband
- 1955: Teach Me How to Cry
- 1955: The Threepenny Opera
- 1956: Cry, the Beloved Country
- 1956: Lovers, Villains and Fools of Shakespeare
- 1956: U.S.A.
- 1957: The Happy Prince
- 1957: The Birthday of the Infanta
- 1957: Hamlet
- 1957: Pelléas and Mélisande
- 1957: Metamorphosis
- 1957: Candida
- 1957: World Famous Dramatic Recitals
- 1957: Pale Horse, Pale Rider
- 1957: Santa Claus
- 1957: For the Time Being
- 1958: Edward II
- 1958: Guests of the Nation
- 1958: Aria Da Capo
- 1958: Maidens and Mistresses at Home at the Zoo
- 1958: The Catbird Seat
- 1958: Riders to the Sea
- 1958: Blood Wedding
- 1958: Curtains Up
- 1959: Philoctetes (Andre Gide play)
- 1959: Philoctetes (Sophocles play)
- 1959: Sweet Confession
- 1959: I Rise in Flame, Cried the Phoenix
- 1959: Soul Gone Home
- 1959: Shakespeare in Harlem
- 1959: This Music Crept by Me Upon the Waters
- 1959: A Masque of Reason
- 1959: The Purification
- 1959: Glory in the Flower
- 1960: Victims of Duty
- 1960: Notes from the Underground
- 1960: Too Close for Comfort
- 1960: The Gay Apprentice
- 1960: The Coggerers
- 1960: Time to Go
- 1960: Nekros
- 1960: Fam and Yam
- 1960: Embers
- 1960: The Lady Akane
- 1960: Hanjo
- 1960: The Shepherd's Chameleon
- 1964: As You Like It
- 1967: The Viewing, (Lyle Kessler); The Deer Park
- 1967: Now Is the Time for All Good Men
- 1968: House of Flowers; Private Lives
- 1968: Futz
- 1969: Dames at Sea
- 1971: Black Girl
- 1971: Acrobats/Line
- 1973: Moonchildren
- 1973: The Children’s Mass
- 1976: Eden
- 1977: A Life in the Theatre
- 1981: Cloud 9; A Soldier's Play
- 1984: 'night, Mother
- 1987: Steel Magnolias
- 1990: Falsettoland
- 1992: Lips Together, Teeth Apart; The Destiny of Me
- 1995: Mrs. Klein
- 1996: The Boys in the Band
- 1996: Tooth of Crime: Second Dance
- 1997: As Bees In Honey Drown
- 2004: Fat Pig
- 2005: Silence! The Musical
- 2006: Some Girl(s)
- 2007: In a Dark Dark House
- 2007: Seussical
- 2008: reasons to be pretty
- 2009: Coraline
- 2012: Carrie
- 2016: The School for Scandal
- 2016: Ride the Cyclone
- 2016: Smokefall
- 2017: The Lightning Thief
- 2019: Fear
- 2023: The Knight of the Burning Pestle
- 2023: Danny and the Deep Blue Sea
- 2024: Oh, Mary!
- 2024: Hold On to Me Darling
- 2025: Vanya
- 2025: Duke and Roya
- 2025: Gruesome Playground Injuries
- 2026: Data
- 2026: KENREX
- 2026: Broad Strokes
