= Germans (band) =

Canadian indie rock band

- Origin: Toronto, Ontario, Canada
- Genres: Indie rock
- Years active: 1999-2010, 2013
- Labels: Arena Rock Recording Co.
- Members: Leon Taheny; Aidan Koper
- Past members: Steve Kado; Steven Lappano; Jesse Foster; Moshe Rozenberg; Livingston Fagan; Neil Harrison; Andrew Scott; Mike LeRiche; Adam Hindle; Tom MacCammon
- Website: 2tru4u.com

The Germans were a Canadian indie rock band whose members included Julian Kado, Roman Harrison, Livingston Fagan, Aidan Koper, Steven Lappano, Jesse Foster, Michael Rozenberg, and Leon Taheny. They are signed to Portland, Oregon-based label Arena Rock Recording Co. The band members are from various nearby Ontario cities: Mississauga, Richmond Hill, and Guelph.

Critics have noted that the music is reminiscent of 1990s indie rock, and, in their "Artist of the Day" feature, Spin magazine compared the band's music to 1990s indie rock band Archers of Loaf. Taheny has cited the band Pavement as a significant influence. Most of the band members contributed to the 2006 Polaris Music Prize-winning album He Poos Clouds by Final Fantasy, which Taheny produced.

Their track "I Am the Teacher" has been in rotation at CBC Radio 3, and played on the CBC Radio 3 podcast. The band toured the U.S. and Canada in early 2007.

Band member Aidan Koper appeared on the Late Show with David Letterman, performing a "Stupid Human Trick" in which he contorted his body through a tennis racquet while juggling.

No one from the band is German, and, despite their debut album being named Cape Fear, no band member has been to Cape Fear or has seen the Robert De Niro film – except for Livingston Fagan, but he had nothing to do with the naming or concept of the album.

== Discography ==
- 2007: Cape Fear
- 2013: Club Tan
