= Cape Fear =

Cape Fear may refer to:

== Film and television ==
- Cape Fear (1962 film), a film by J. Lee Thompson starring Gregory Peck and Robert Mitchum
- Cape Fear (1991 film), a remake by Martin Scorsese starring Robert De Niro and Nick Nolte
- "Cape Feare", a 1993 episode of The Simpsons
- Cape Fear (TV series), remake starring Javier Bardem and Amy Adams

== Places ==
- Cape Fear (headland), a promontory of the coast of North Carolina
- Cape Fear (region), region of North Carolina surrounding Wilmington
- Cape Fear, Harnett County, North Carolina
- Cape Fear River

== Schools ==
- Cape Fear Academy
- Cape Fear Community College
- Cape Fear High School

== Other uses ==
- Cape Fear (album), 2007, by Canadian indie rock band Germans

== See also ==
- Cap Fear (1901–1978), Canadian football player
- Cape Fear Crocs, a former minor league baseball team
- Cape Fear Indians, a tribe of Native Americans who lived on the Cape Fear River in North Carolina
- Cape Fear Museum
