= Elise Fear =

Canadian electrical engineer

Elise C. Fear is a Canadian electrical engineer whose research focuses on microwave imaging for the diagnosis of breast cancer. She is a professor in the Department of Electrical and Software Engineering at the University of Calgary and co-founder of the spin-off company Wave View Imaging.

== Education and career ==
Fear graduated from the University of Waterloo in 1995 with a bachelor's degree in systems design engineering. She continued her studies in electrical engineering at the University of Victoria, where she received a master's degree in 1997 and completed a Ph.D. in 2001, supervised by Maria Stuchly.

She came to the University of Calgary in 2002 as an NSERC Postdoctoral Fellow, before continuing there as a faculty member. From 2013 to 2017 she held the Alberta Innovates Technology Futures iCORE Strategic Chair in Multimodality Imaging and Sensing, and in 2018–2019 she held a Killam Annual Professorship. In 2020, she co-founded Wave View Imaging.

== Recognition ==
Technology Alberta recognized Fear in 2023 with an Alberta Science and Technology (ASTech) Award in the category "Medical / Healthcare / Pharmaceuticals".

Fear was inducted as a 2024 fellow of the Engineering Institute of Canada, through a nomination from IEEE Canada.
