= F.E.A.R. (disambiguation) =

F.E.A.R. is a series of horror-themed first-person shooter video games.

F.E.A.R. may also refer to:

== Music ==
- F.E.A.R. (Papa Roach album), 2015
- F.E.A.R. (Stand Atlantic album), 2022
- F.E.A.R. (Forgotten, Enslaved, Admired, Released), an album by Dawn of Destiny
- Fuck Everyone and Run (F E A R), an album by Marillion
- "F.E.A.R." (song), by Ian Brown
- "F.E.A.R.", a song by Testament from the album The Formation of Damnation

== Other uses ==
- F.E.A.R. (video game), the first game in the F.E.A.R. series
- F.E.A.R., an antagonist organization in the 1967 animated series Birdman and the Galaxy Trio
- FEAR (terrorist group), a 2011–2012 American right-wing militia organization
- Forfeiture Endangers American Rights, or FEAR, an American activist group opposed to asset forfeiture

== See also ==
- Fear (disambiguation)
