= Nicola Fear =

British epidemiologist and academic (1969–2026)

Nicola Fear CBE
- Born: 3 May 1969; Dunstable, Bedfordshire, England
- Died: 16 February 2026 (aged 56)
- Education: London School of Hygiene & Tropical Medicine; King's College London; University of Oxford
- Scientific career
- Workplaces: Ministry of Defence; King's College London
- Thesis: Paternal occupation and childhood cancer : an analysis of routinely collected death certification data (1997)

Nicola Townsend Fear (3 May 1969 – 16 February 2026) was a British epidemiologist who was a professor and Chair of Epidemiology at King's College London. She was co-director of the Forces in Mind Trust Research Centre and director of the King's Centre for Military Health Research. Her research looks at the impact of military service on families. She was appointed a CBE in the 2025 New Year Honours.

== Early life and education ==
Fear was born in Dunstable, Bedfordshire, England on 3 May 1969. She studied pharmacology at King's College London. She trained in epidemiology at the London School of Hygiene & Tropical Medicine and University of Oxford. Her doctoral research explored parental occupation and childhood cancer. She investigated whether the children of men with contact of many people were more at risk of leukemia, and found that childhood leukaemia was not associated to the amount of social contact of their fathers. After completing her doctorate she worked as a postdoctoral researcher, studying the associations between occupational exposures and cancer risks.

== Research and career ==
Fear joined the Ministry of Defence, where she worked as an epidemiologist in defence statistics. There were a series of inquiries into the deaths at Deepcut army barracks, and the preparation for the 2003 invasion of Iraq at the time. In 2004, she returned to academia, joining Simon Wessely as a senior lecturer. In 2011, Fear was appointed Director of the King’s Centre of Military Health Research.

Her research considered the impact of military service on service people and their families. Supported by the Office for Veterans Affairs, Fear has studied the mental health and wellbeing of the British Armed Forces and their families. She has shown that veterans who had been deployed in a combat role had a very high rate of post-traumatic stress disorder (17%) compared to those in a service support role (6%). She has investigated the physical ad psycho-social outcomes of battlefield casualties in the War in Afghanistan through the ArmeD SerVices TrAuma and RehabilitatioN OutComE (ADVANCE) study. The UK's world-leading battlefield trauma care increased survival rates of severely injured personnel. She found that injured service people without amputations had higher rates of depression and PTSD compared to their amputated and uninjured counterparts, and that those with amputations had greater rates of post-traumatic growth. Her recent research has studied the impact of military service on families.

Fear was made a Chair of Epidemiology at King's College London in 2011.

During the COVID-19 pandemic, Fear provided expert advice to the Scientific Advisory Group for Emergencies through the Independent Scientific Pandemic Insights Group on Behaviours. Fear is a trustee of Help for Heroes. Fear was made a CBE in the 2025 New Year Honours.

== Personal life and death ==
Nicola was married to Dan Wood and a mother to two children, Mary Megan Woodfear (born 2004) and Max Moses Woodfear (born 2007). She died from cancer on 16 February 2026, at the age of 56.

== Selected publications ==
- Christopher Whitaker; Sharon Stevelink; Nicola T. Fear (28 August 2017). "The Use of Facebook in Recruiting Participants for Health Research Purposes: A Systematic Review". Journal of Medical Internet Research. 19 (8): e290. doi:10.2196/jmir.7071. ISSN 1438-8871. PMC 5594255. PMID 28851679. Wikidata Q38635957.
- Nicola T Fear; Margaret Jones; Dominic Murphy; et al. (12 May 2010). "What are the consequences of deployment to Iraq and Afghanistan on the mental health of the UK armed forces? A cohort study". The Lancet. 375 (9728): 1783–1797. doi:10.1016/s0140-6736(10)60672-1. ISSN 0140-6736. PMID 20471076. Wikidata Q43062896.
- Matthew Hotopf; Lisa Hull; Nicola T Fear; et al. (1 May 2006). "The health of UK military personnel who deployed to the 2003 Iraq war: a cohort study". The Lancet. 367 (9524): 1731–1741. doi:10.1016/s0140-6736(06)68662-5. ISSN 0140-6736. PMID 16731268. Wikidata Q34531471.
