= Cape Fear (album) =

Studio album by Germans
- Released: 13 February 2007
- Recorded: Go Get Studios; MSTRKRFT; The Fawn Gallery
- Genre: Indie rock
- Label: Arena Rock

Professional ratings
Review scores
Source	Rating
Pitchfork	(6.5/10)

Cape Fear is the debut album by Canadian indie rock band Germans, released on 13 February 2007, on the Arena Rock label.

== Track listing ==
All songs written by Germans, except as noted:

1. "Tiger Vacuum Bottle"
2. "No Job"
3. "Nature's Mouth"
4. "I Am the Teacher"
5. "So It's Out!"
6. "Franchise"
7. "Pogos Abenteur" (written by Bodenstandig 2000)
8. "M. Bison"
9. "Brown's"
