= Jennifer Fear =

Jennifer Fear is the CEO of Step Forward, a London charity aimed at improving the life chances of young people in Tower Hamlets. She has also received a Civic Award for "improved quality of life for local people by providing services, beyond what they are paid to do" in 2017.

== Recognition ==
- Fear was ranked 44th, in 2012, on the Independent on Sunday's Pink List
