= Captain Fear =

Mascot for the NFL's Tampa Bay Buccaneers

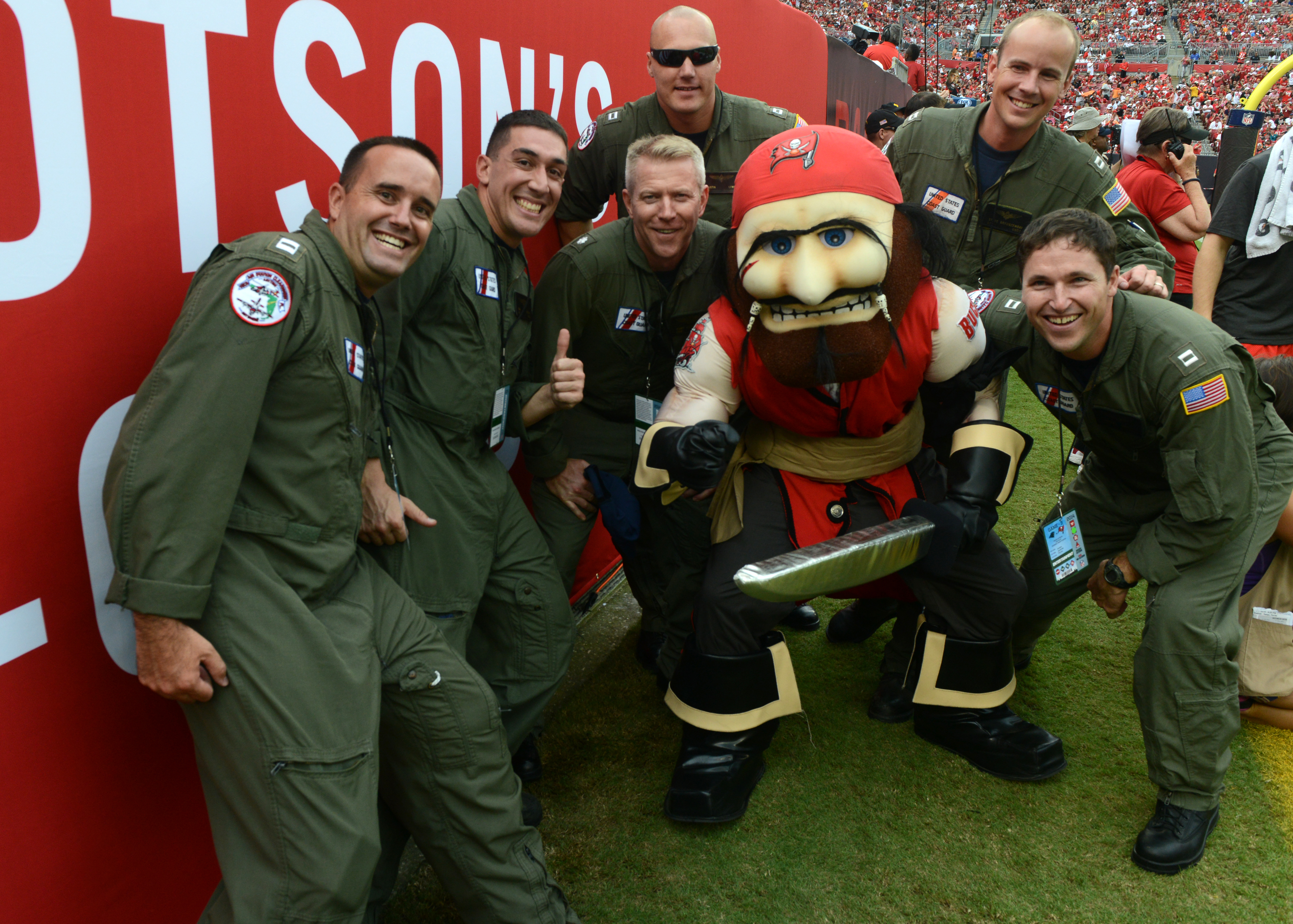
Captain Fear in a photograph with several members of the US Coast Guard at a football game in 2014.

Captain Fear, a Caribbean pirate captain, is the official mascot of the Tampa Bay Buccaneers of the National Football League. He has blue eyes, black hair, thick eyebrows, and a full beard. He has been the mascot of the Buccaneers since June 2000. He replaced a parrot mascot known as Skully. He was originally played by Mike Mashke until his retirement in 2006.
