= Fears (surname) =

Fears is a surname. Notable people with the surname include:

- Ivan Fears (born 1954), American football coach
- Jeremiah Fears (born 2006), American basketball player
- Jeremy Fears Jr. (born 2005), American basketball player
- J. Rufus Fears (1945–2012), American historian, scholar, teacher and author
- Peggy Fears (1903–1994), American actress
- Shamari Fears (born 1980), American singer
- Tom Fears (1923–2000), American football wide receiver

== See also ==
- Fear (surname)
