= Fear (2019 play) =

2019 play by Matt Williams

Fear is a play by Matt Williams. It was first produced in 2019 and directed by Tea Alagić. The play depicts a confrontation between New Jersey locals following the disappearance of a girl in the woods.

== Characters ==
- Phil: a plumber
- Ethan: a professor
- Jamie: a local teenager

== Productions ==
The play had its world premiere in 2019 at the Off-Broadway Lucille Lortel Theatre. The production was directed by Tea Alagić and starred Obi Abili, Enrico Colantoni, and Alexander Garfin.

== Critical reception ==
The 2019 production received mixed reviews. Elisabeth Vincentelli's in The New York Times calling the show a "tepid thriller," saying that "the tension [was] so thin, you could cut it with dental floss." Frank Scheck in The Hollywood Reporter wrote that the production "frequently buckles under the weight of its contrivances" but "proves gripping from the first moments."
