= Le Fear =

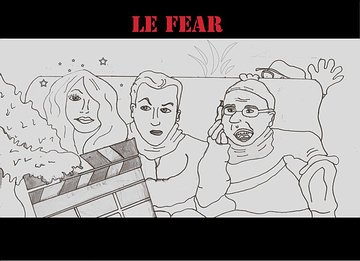
- Directed by: Jason Croot
- Written by: Jason Croot
- Produced by: Che Conroy; Jason Croot; Paul Knight; Jamie O'Keefe; Jon Smith
- Starring: Kyri Saphiris; Spencer Austin; Lucinda Rhodes-Flaherty; Ilona Saic; Andre Sampson; Patrick Naughton; Fred Moss; Otis Samuels; Paul Knight; Dave Wiltshire
- Cinematography: Jon Smith
- Edited by: Christopher A. Martin
- Music by: Madalena Alberto; Richard Preston; Gary Stewart; Edward Top
- Release date: 1 December 2010
- Running time: 62 minutes
- Country: United Kingdom
- Language: English
- Budget: £1,900

Le Fear is a 2010 British comedy film directed by Jason Croot (in his directorial debut) who also features in a supporting role. Shot on an ultra-low budget of less than £2,000, and filmed over the course of just three days, the film stars Kyri Saphiris, Spencer Austin and Lucinda Rhodes-Flaherty, among others. The story follows the experiences of a bunch of actors as they attempt to make an ultimately inept and poor quality film. The film was released on 1 December 2010. A sequel, Le Fear II: Le Sequel, was released in 2016.

== Plot ==
A middle-aged film director realises his career is going nowhere, and takes it upon himself to finance and produce his own independent film. However, his poor casting decisions and unwilling crew turn out to be the project's downfall and his film turns into a mess.

== Cast ==
- Kyri Saphiris as Carlos
- Spencer Austin as Leon
- Lucinda Rhodes-Flaherty as Debbie D
- Ilona Saic as Gabby Le Fluer
- Andre Sampson as Stuart
- Patrick Naughton as Harry the Sparky
- Fred Moss as Larry Rotchschild
- Otis Samuels as Clapper AKA Tom the Clapper
- Paul Knight as Dave the Vampire
- Dave Wiltshire as Jim the Werewolf
- Nitin Ranpura as Rav
- Nick Berwick as Trevor
- Jason Cook as Vincent
- Meaw Davis as Pretty
- Tony Resta as Jeoy Le Blanc
- Jason Croot as Rasputin
- Che Conroy as Susan
- Sarah Lynne as Voice

== Reception ==
Critical reaction to the film was generally positive. Aaron Vacaro of Bad Move Nite, wrote "Le Fear is a comedy of errors that perfectly captures the absurdity of making a bad movie". John Shatzer of Gut Munchers said "...director Jason Croot brings us a really good movie about someone making a really terrible movie. That is a really nifty bit of filmmaking.". Paul Pritchard of Pulp Movies stated "...the people Carlos hires are an appalling collection of misfits and incompetents. This very effectively primes us for the comedy of errors that is to follow.", later saying "The film left me wanting more – much more...".

Duane L. Martin of Rogue Cinema gave a slightly less favourable review of the film, saying "the sound wasn't always the best" as well as "the visual quality of it was rather lacking". He did, however, praise the film's general concept. Jenny Kermode, of Eye for Film was one of the few reviewers to give a more negative review of the film, awarding it only two stars out of five. She did, however, respond favourably to the low-budget nature of the film, stating "When one considers that Le Fear was made in three days on a mere £1,900, it's astounding."
