= MetOp-SG A1/Sentinel-5A =

European Meteorology and Earth Observation satellite

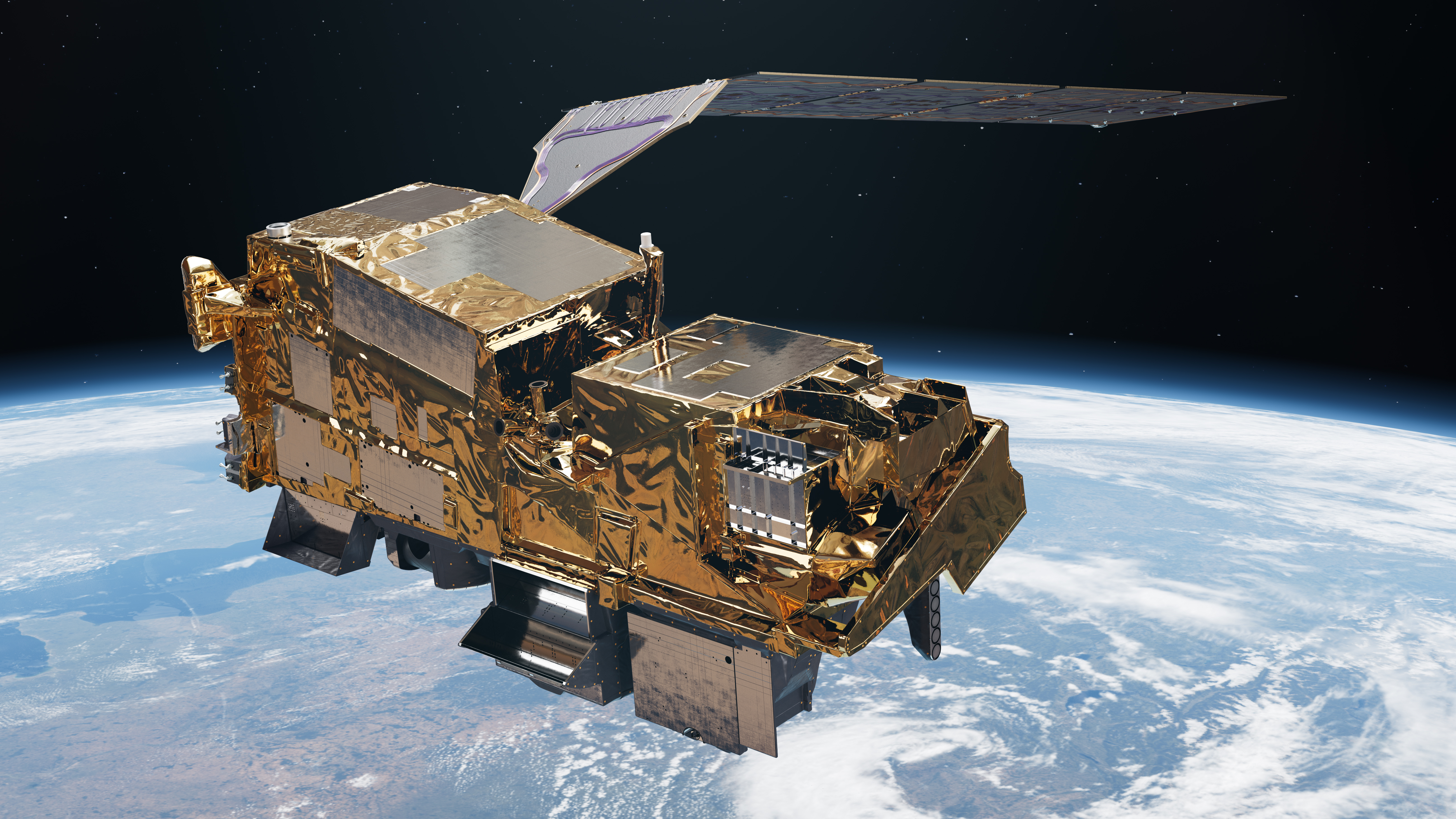
- MetOp Second Generation A-type satellite
- Mission type: Meteorology/Earth observation
- Operator: ESA, EUMETSAT
- Website: MetOp-SG (ESA); Sentinel-5 (ESA)
- Mission duration: Planned: 7. 5 years

Spacecraft properties
- Spacecraft type: MetOp-SG
- Manufacturer: Airbus Defence and Space
- Launch mass: 4,040 kg (8,910 lb)

Start of mission
- Launch date: 13 August 2025, 00:37 UTC
- Rocket: Ariane 62 (VA264)
- Launch site: Kourou ELA-4
- Contractor: Arianespace

Orbital parameters
- Reference system: Geocentric
- Regime: SSO

MetOp-SG A1/Sentinel-5A is a European meteorology and Earth observation satellite. It is the first of three satellites in the Sentinel-5 constellation, part of the European Union's Copernicus programme on Earth observation and also first of six MetOp-SG satellites.

== Timeline ==
=== Launch ===
In January 2025, ESA signed a contract with Arianespace to launch the satellite in the August 2025 on Ariane 6. On 13 August 2025, MetOp-SG A1 with Sentinel-5A has launched into space on Ariane 62 L6003.

=== First data ===
Less than three weeks after launch, EUMETSAT received and processed initial data from two instruments: the Microwave Sounder (MWS) and Radio Occultation Sounder (RO). On 15 September 2025, EUMETSAT has released the first images captured by the Multiviewing multichannel multipolarisation imager (3MI) on 28 August over the Mediterranean showing cloud structures over Italy and wildfire smoke near Greece. On 07 October 2025, EUMETSAT has released the first Earth images from the satellite's METimage instrument, including an image of Hurricane Humberto. On 22 October, EUMETSAT has released the first data from the Infrared Atmospheric Sounding Interferometer-New Generation (IASI-NG) instrument, a spectrum showing the composition of the atmosphere over Toulouse and a near-global map of thermal properties of clouds and Earth's surface.

First data from the Sentinel-5A mission were released on 26 November 2025 during the ESA ministerial council held in Bremen, Germany. They included maps of atmospheric concentrations of formaldehyde (HCHO) and ozone (O_{3}). The formaldehyde map showed elevated values along the coast of Angola, caused by wildfire emissions, and over the Central African Republic caused by fire and biogenic sources. The ozone map showed the seasonal depletion of stratospheric ozone over Antarctica.

== Gallery ==
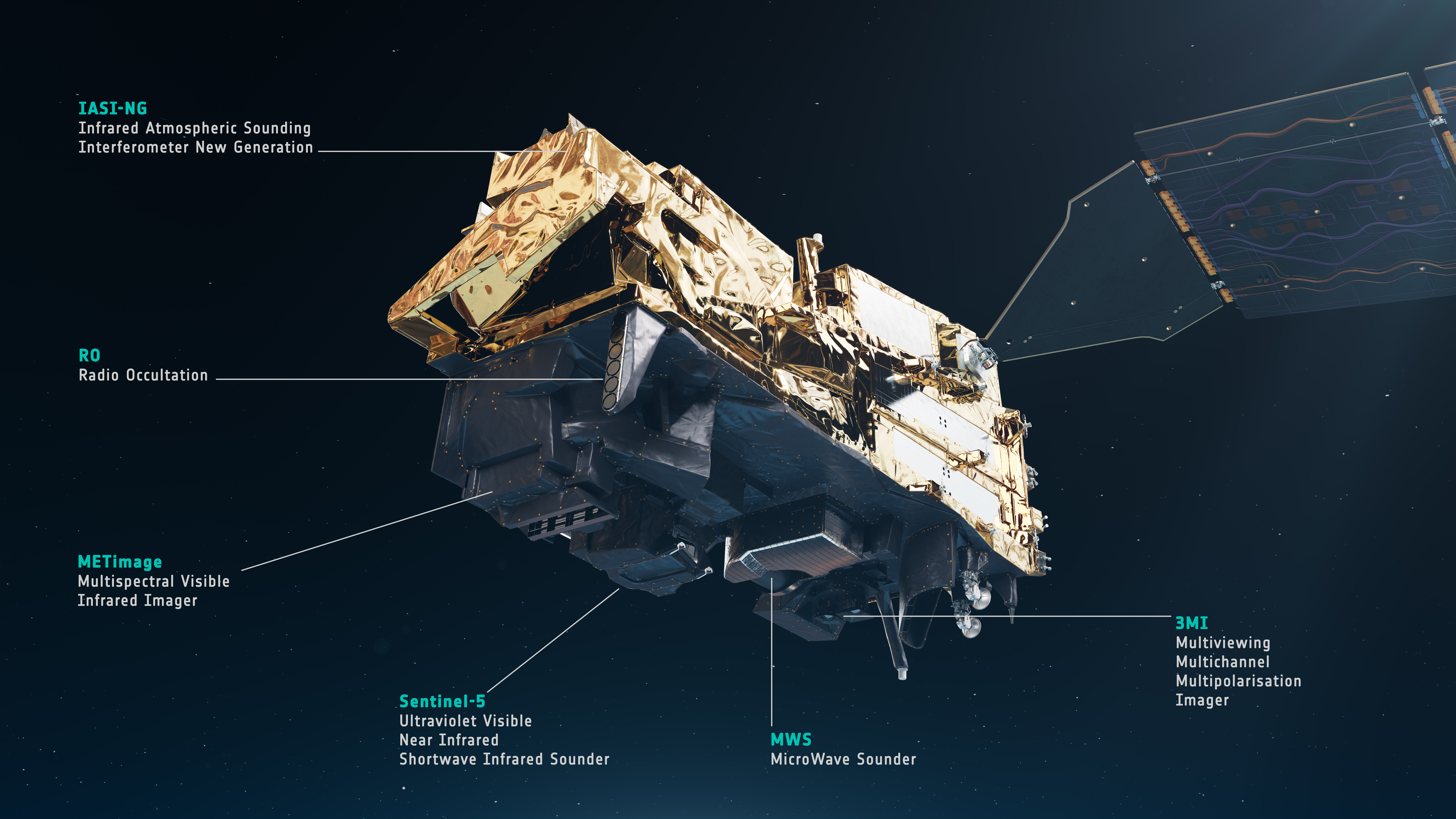
MetOp-SG-A instruments

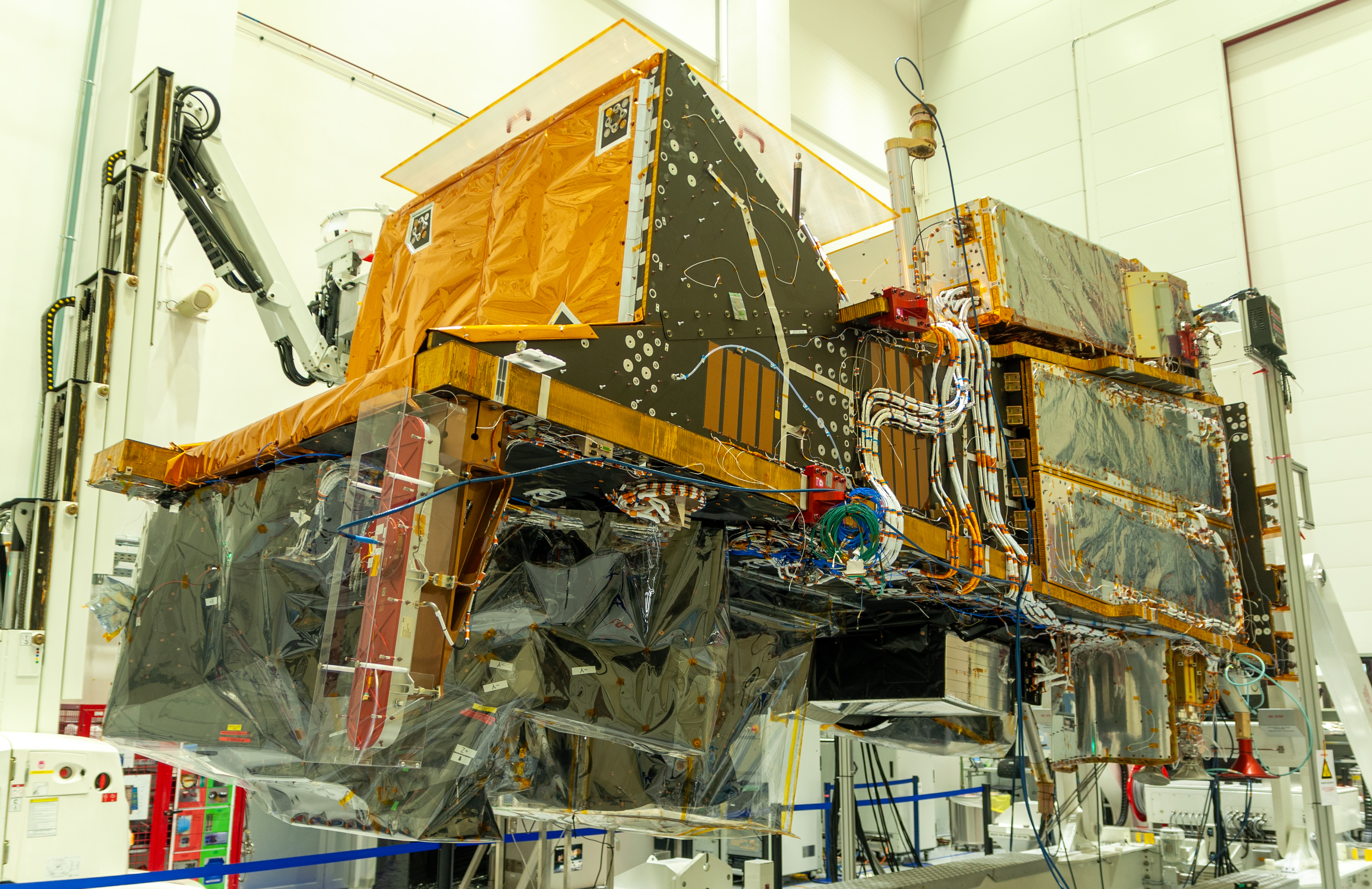
Metop-SG A1 inside Airbus Defence and Space Astrolabe facilities

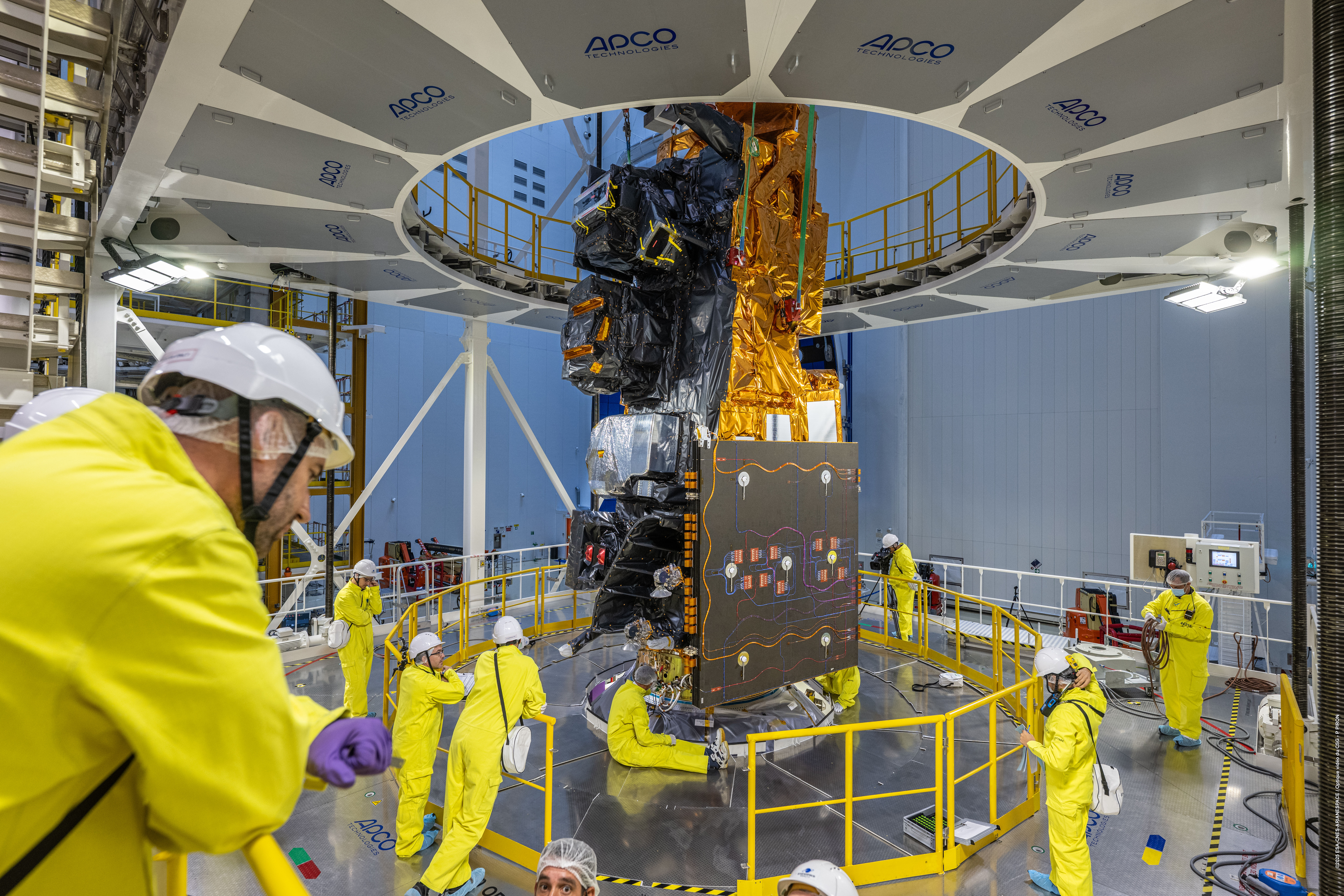
Joining MetOp-SG-A1 satellite to Ariane 6 launch adaptor

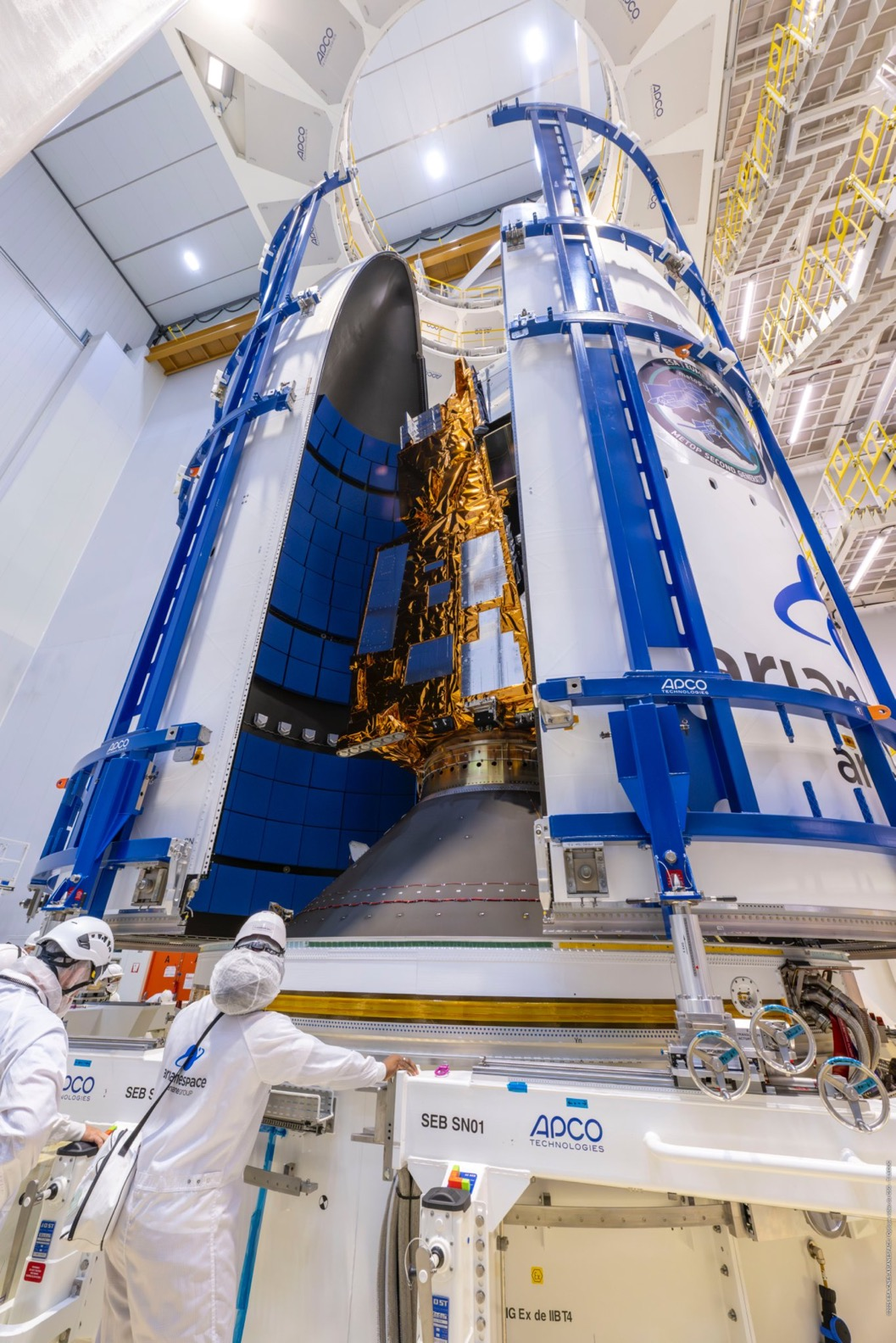
Metop-SG A1 being enclosed in the Ariane 6 payload fairing

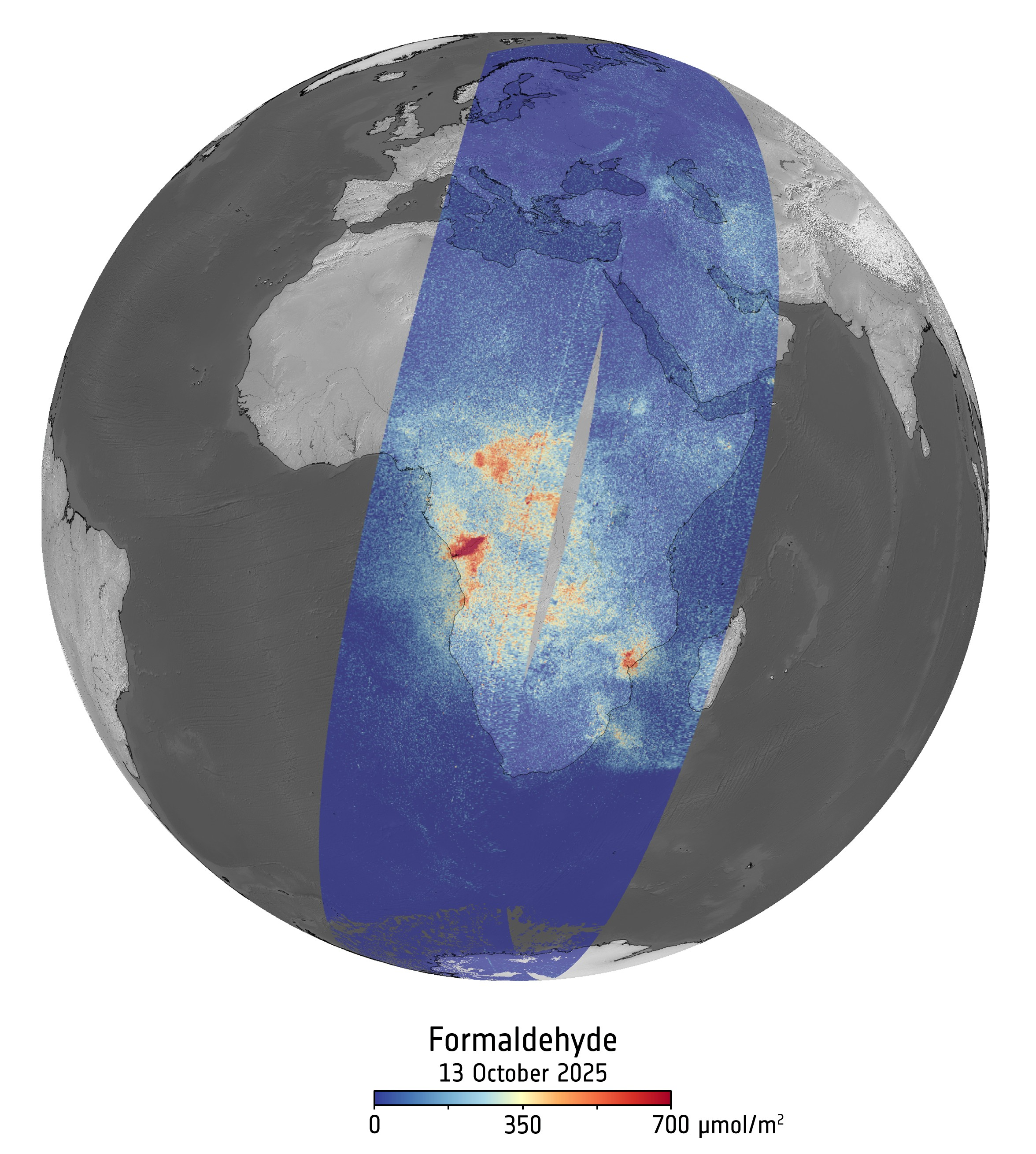
Formaldehyde over Africa measured by Sentinel-5A

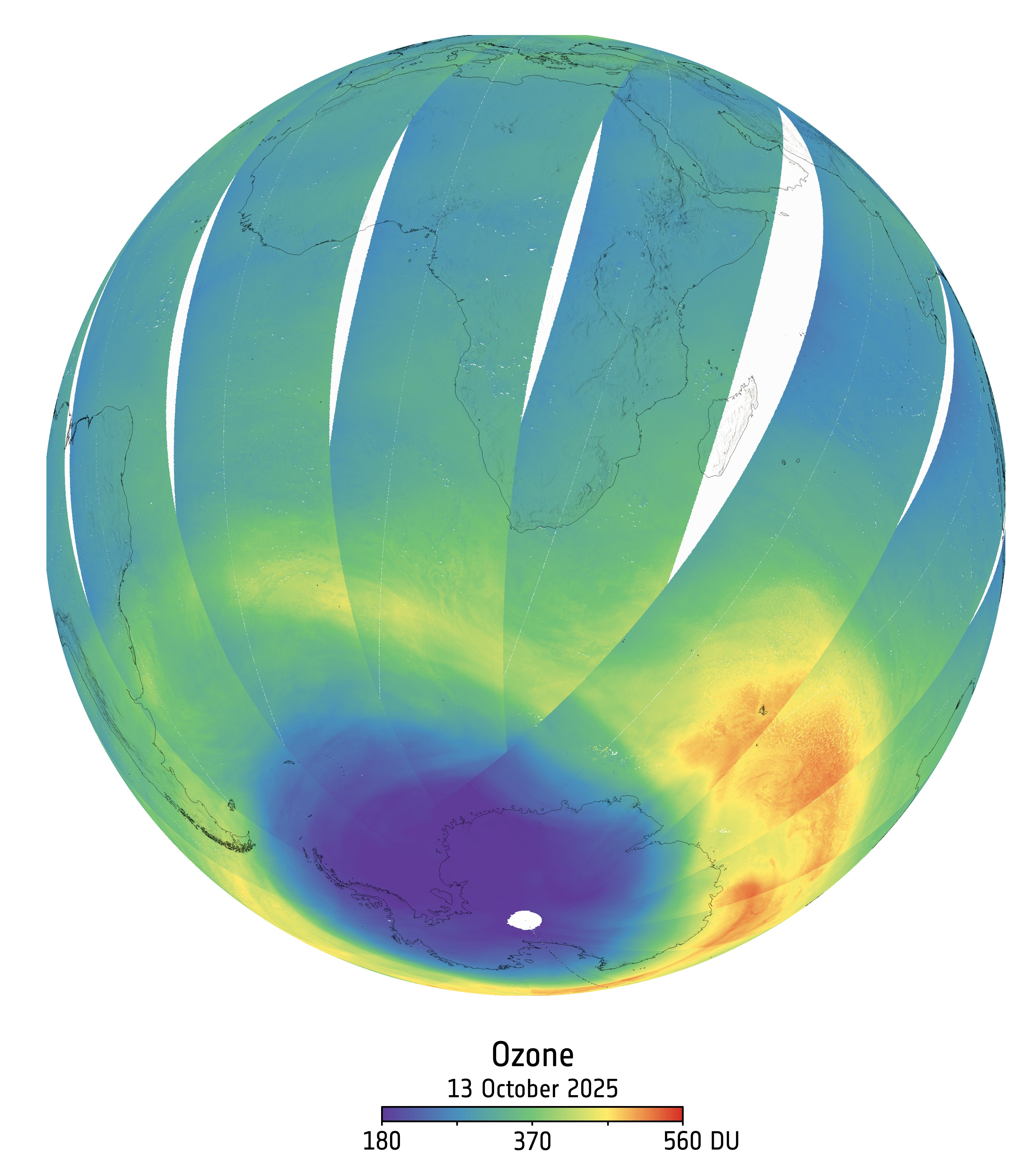
Global ozone measured by Sentinel-5A

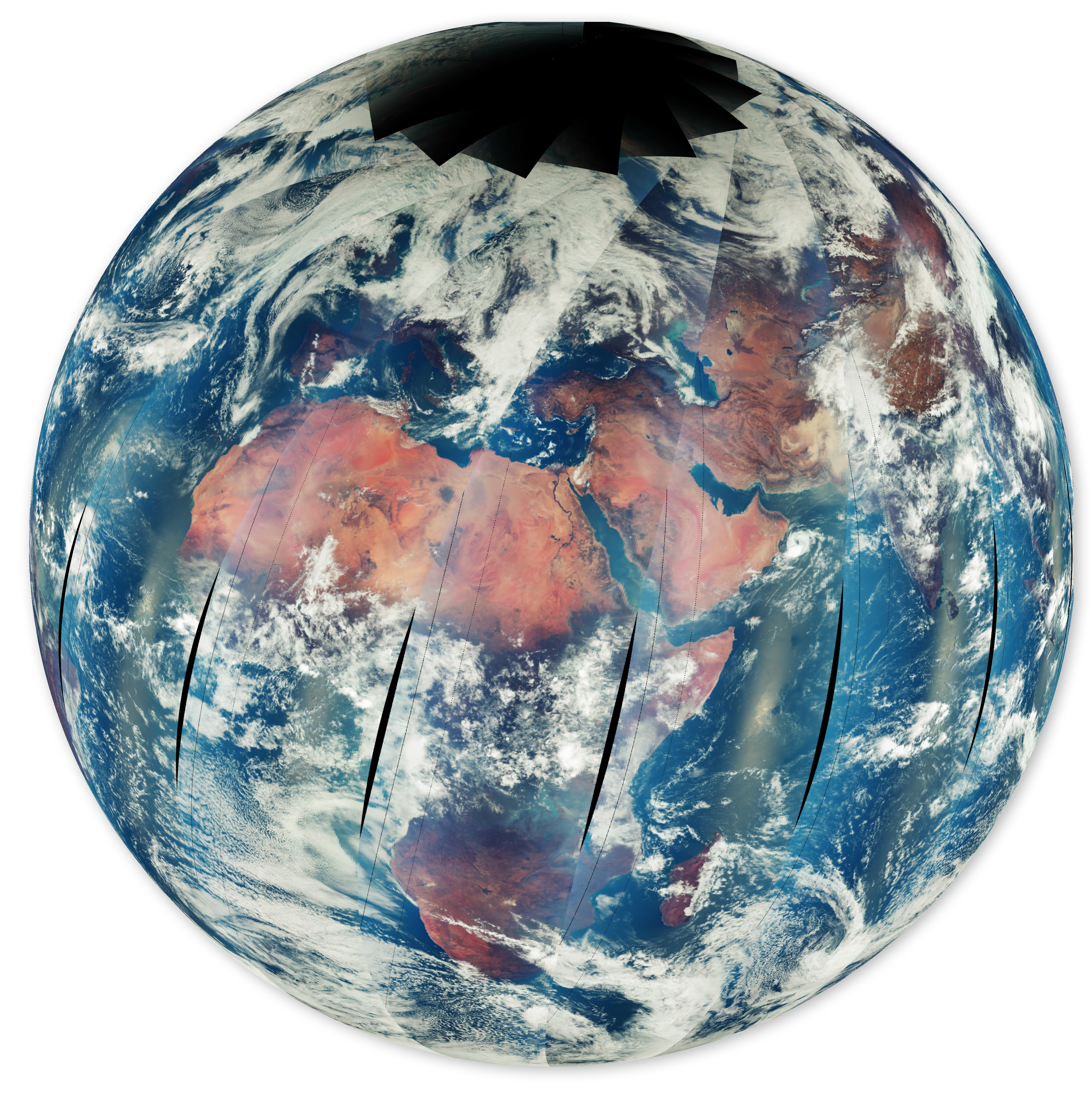
Earth radiance measured by Sentinel-5A

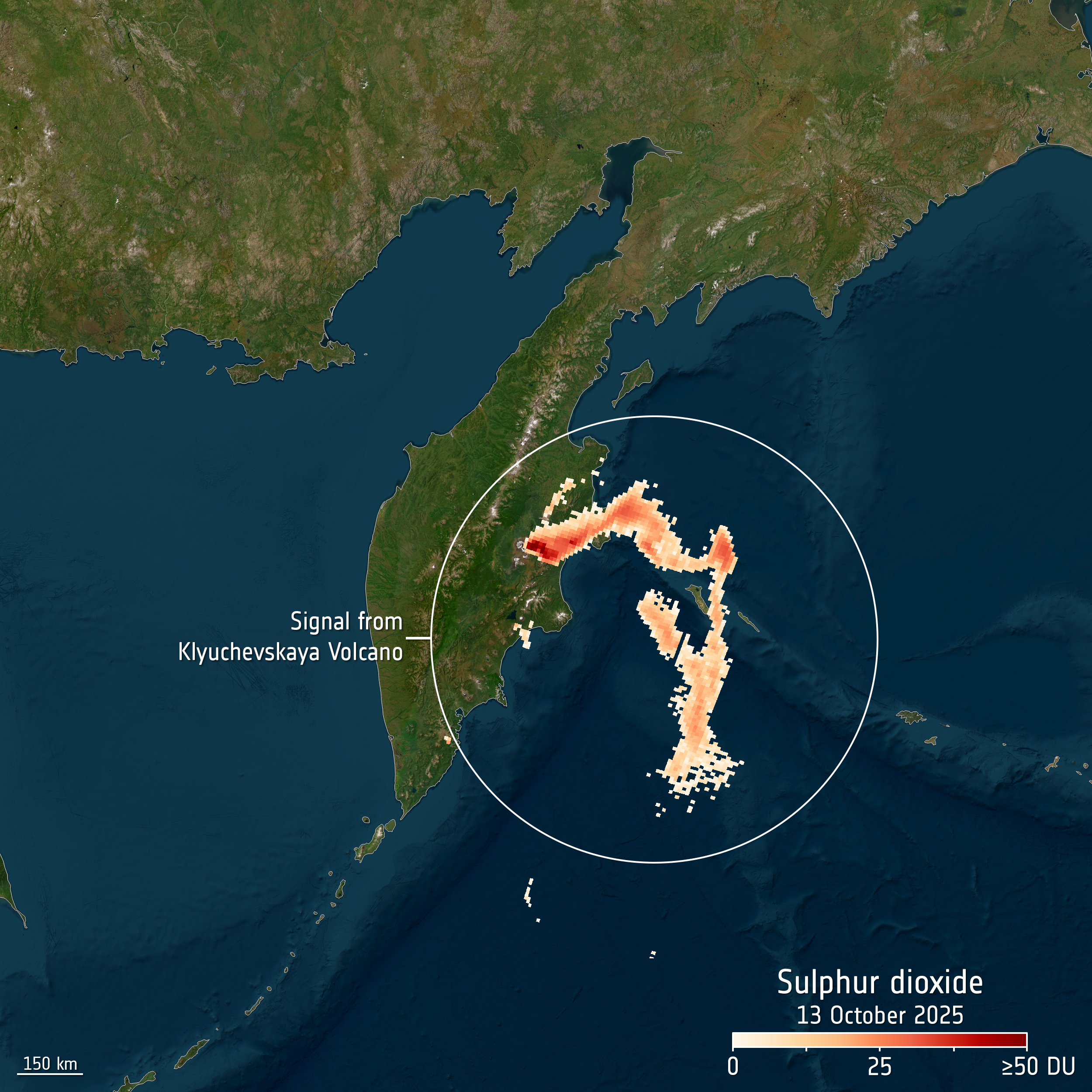
Sulphur dioxide over Klyuchevskaya Volcano measured by Sentinel-5A

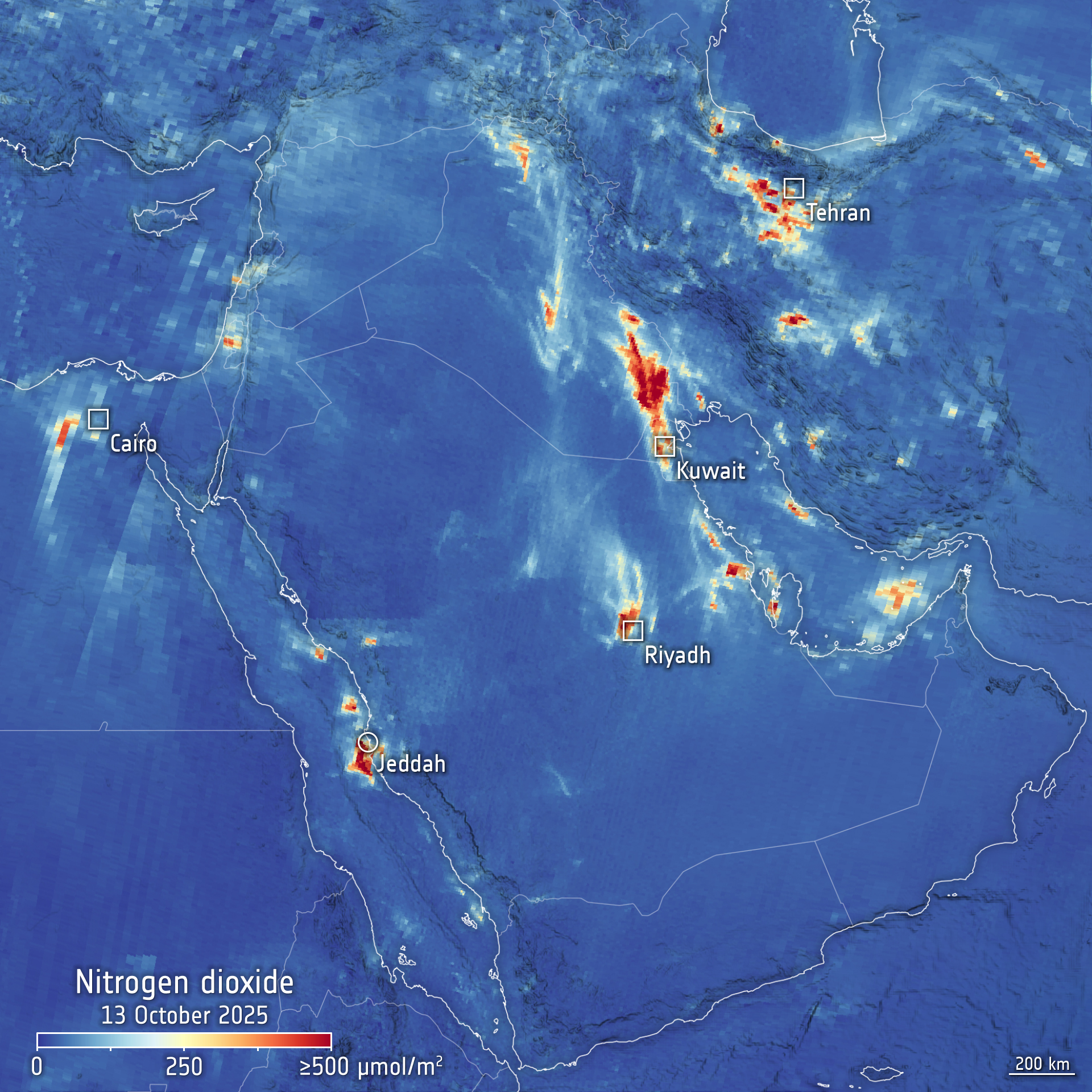
Nitrogen dioxide over the Middle East measured by Sentinel-5A

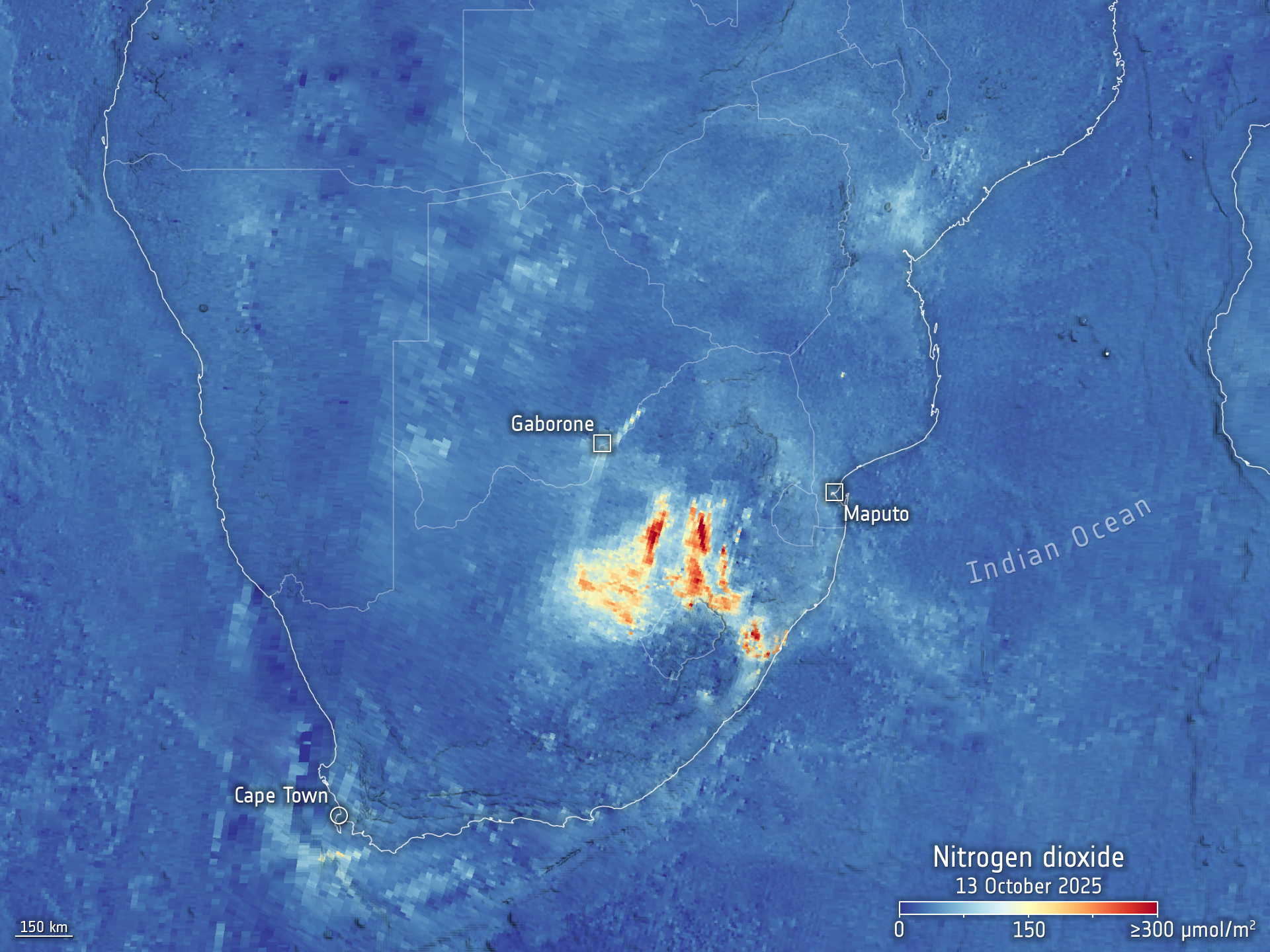
Nitrogen dioxide over Southern Africa measured by Sentinel-5A

== See also ==
- 2025 in spaceflight
- List of European Space Agency programmes and missions
