= List of physics conferences =

List of academic conferences in physics and astronomy

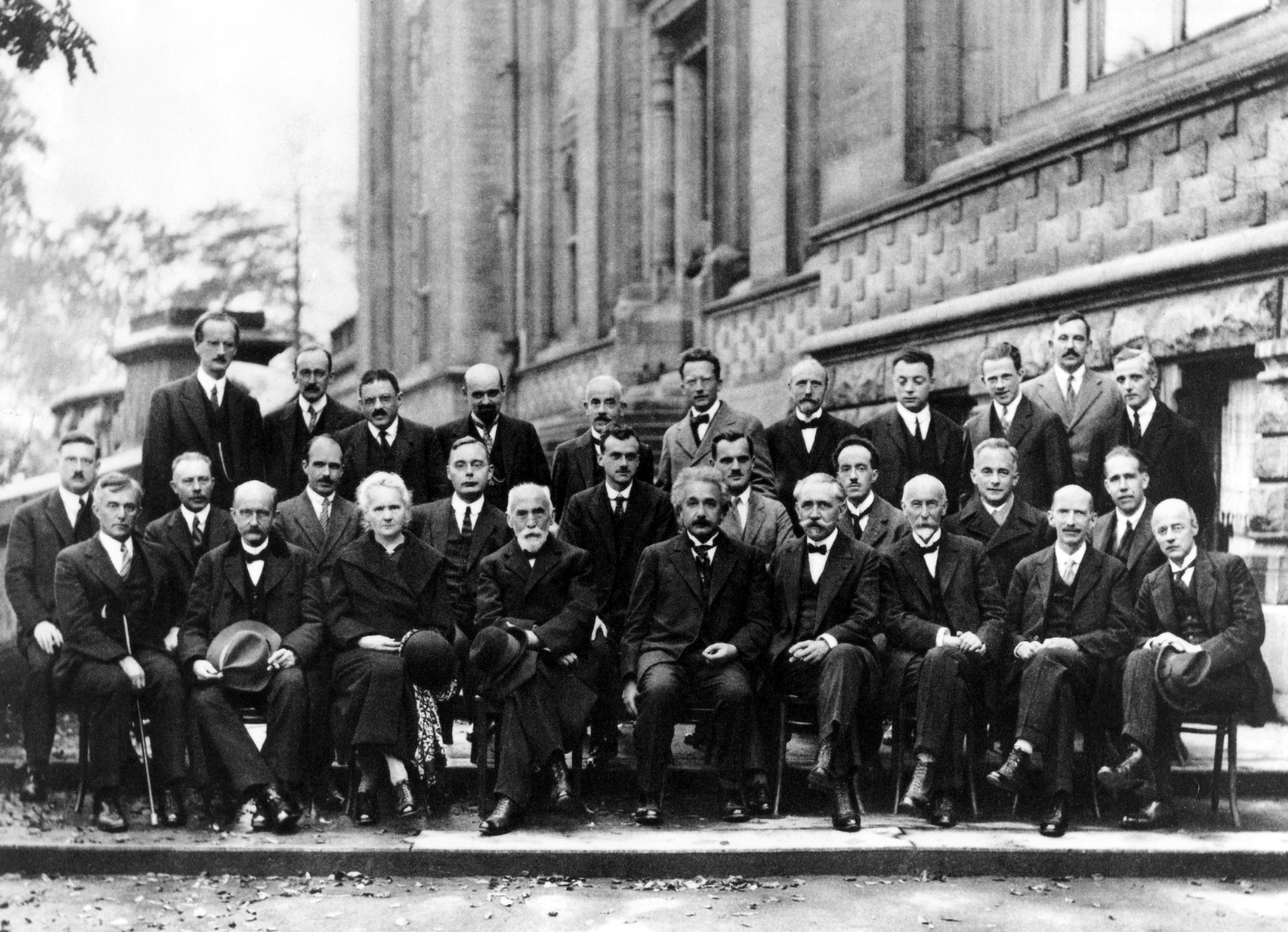
1927 Solvay Conference on electrons and photons

This is a list of academic conferences in physics and astronomy.

== On specific lectures ==
This section includes only events that have a link within Wikipedia

- 1959 Richard Feynman's There's Plenty of Room at the Bottom, American Physical Society meeting

== On singular or limited events ==
This section includes only events that have a link within Wikipedia

- 1798 European congress of astronomers
- 1900 International Congress of Physics
- 1927 Como Conference
- 1935–1947 Washington Conferences on Theoretical Physics
- 1947 Shelter Island Conference
- 1948 Pocono Conference
- 1949 Oldstone Conference
- 1952–1958 Sherwood conferences by Project Sherwood
- 1959 Chapel Hill Conference
- 1987 American Physical Society meeting, also known as the Woodstock of physics
- 2025 Helgoland 2025, during the International Year of Quantum Science and Technology

== Recurring events ==
- European Conference on the Dynamics of Molecular Systems
- International Colloquium on Group Theoretical Methods in Physics
- International Conference of Laser Applications by the Society for Optical and Quantum Electronics
- International Conference of Physics Students by the International Association of Physics Students (IAPS)
- International Conference on
  - Cold Fusion
  - Defects in Semiconductors
  - Differential Geometric Methods in Theoretical Physics
  - Electronic Properties of Two-Dimensional Systems
  - High Energy Physics, by the International Union of Pure and Applied Physics (IUPAP), also known as the Rochester Conferences
  - Low Temperature Physics by the IUPAP
  - Neutrino Physics and Astrophysics
  - Nitride Semiconductors
  - Photonic, Electronic and Atomic Collisions
  - Physics of Light–Matter Coupling in Nanostructures
  - Radiation Effects in Insulators
  - Surface Plasmon Photonics
  - the Physics of Semiconductors
  - X-Ray Microscopy
- International Congress on Mathematical Physics by the International Association of Mathematical Physics
- International Cosmic Ray Conference by the International Union of Pure and Applied Physics (IUPAP)
- International Society for the Study of Time
- International Workshop on 1 & 2 Dimensional Magnetic Measurement and Testing
- International Workshop on Nitride Semiconductors
- International Youth Nuclear Congress
- International Symposium on Small Particles and Inorganic Clusters
- Lindau Nobel Laureate Meetings
- Lunar and Planetary Science Conference
- Macarthur Astronomy Forum
- Middle European Cooperation in Statistical Physics
- Minkowski Meetings on the Foundations of Spacetime Physics by the Institute of Foundational Studies Hermann Minkowski
- National Astronomy Meeting
- Pacific Coast Gravity Meeting
- Poincaré Seminars
- SigmaPhi International Conference on Statistical Physics
- Snowmass Process by the American Physical Society (APS)
- Soft Magnetic Materials Conference
- Solvay Conference by the International Solvay Institutes for Physics and Chemistry
- STATPHYS by the International Union of Pure and Applied Physics (IUPAP)
- Strings (conference)
- Texas Symposium on Relativistic Astrophysics
- Workshop on Geometric Methods in Physics by the University of Białystok.

== Proceedings ==
This section includes only publications related to conferences that have a link within Wikipedia

- AIP Conference Proceedings by the American Institute of Physics (AIP)
- Journal of Physics: Conference Series by IOP Publishing
- Proceedings of SPIE

== See also ==
- List of physics journals
- List of important publications in physics
- List of physics awards
- List of computer science conferences
