= Robert Serber =

American physicist (1909–1997)

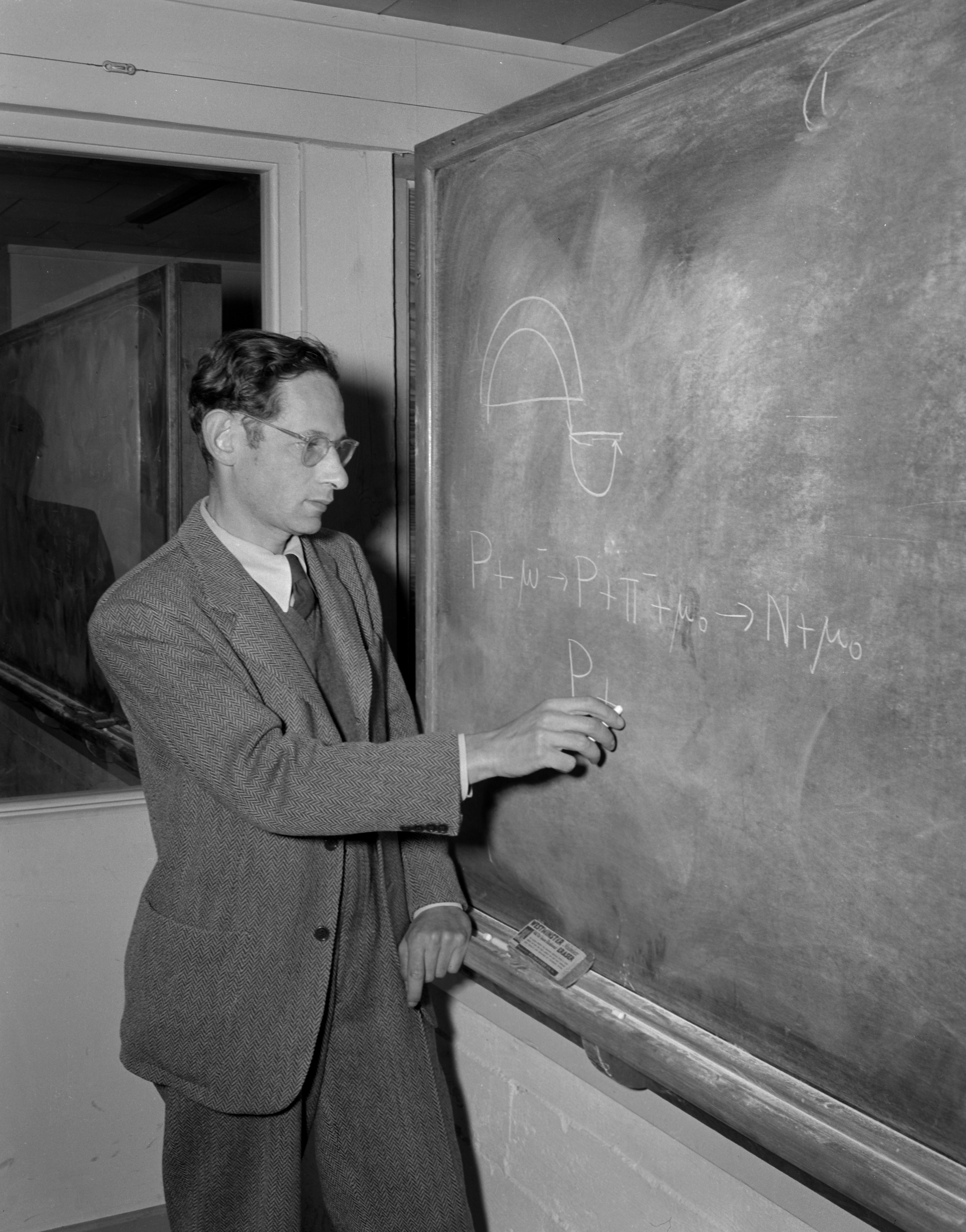
- Serber in February 1948
- Born: March 14, 1909; Philadelphia, Pennsylvania, U.S.
- Died: June 1, 1997 (aged 88); New York City, U.S.
- Education: Central High School; Lehigh University; University of Wisconsin–Madison
- Known for: Manhattan Project; High-energy physics
- Spouses: Charlotte Leof (m. 1933; died 1967) Fiona St. Clair (m. 1979)
- Scientific career
- Fields: Nuclear physics; Particle Physics
- Workplaces: University of California, Berkeley; University of Illinois, Urbana–Champaign; Columbia University
- Doctoral advisor: John Hasbrouck Van Vleck
- Doctoral students: Keith Brueckner; Leon Cooper; H. Pierre Noyes; Donald H. Weingarten; Peter A. Wolff

Robert Serber (March 14, 1909 – June 1, 1997) was an American theoretical physicist who contributed to multiple branches of physics and who served as a bridge between theorists and experimentalists. As a key participant of the Manhattan Project, Serber gave lectures explaining the basic principles and goals of the project, which were printed and supplied to all incoming scientific staff. These became known as The Los Alamos Primer. The New York Times called him "the intellectual midwife at the birth of the atomic bomb." He has been portrayed in films and documentaries including the 2023 film Oppenheimer where he is played by Michael Angarano.

== Early life and education ==
He was born in West Philadelphia, Pennsylvania, the eldest son of Rose (née Frankel), a daughter of Polish migrants, and David Serber, a Russian immigrant. He grew up in an artistically and politically active Jewish family. His mother died when he was 13 and his father married Frances Leof in shortly after. He graduated from Central High School in Philadelphia in 1926 and matriculated at Lehigh University, intending to become a mechanical engineer, like one of his uncles. After graduating in 1930, Serber turned his attention towards physics and secured a post as a teaching assistant at the University of Wisconsin–Madison, under the supervision of John Van Vleck, who taught him advanced courses on the then nascent modern quantum mechanics. As a graduate student, he published multiple papers, the first of which concerned the Faraday effect for molecules. He married Charlotte Leof, the daughter of his stepmother's uncle, in a civil ceremony 1933. He earned his doctorate in 1934.

== Early career ==
Shortly before receiving his doctorate, Serber was selected for a National Research Council postdoctoral fellowship. He planned on conducting research at Princeton University with Eugene Wigner, as advised by his mentor. On the way east, Serber stopped at the Ann Arbor to attend the summer school in physics at University of Michigan. Here he met J. Robert Oppenheimer, who was delivering lectures on the Dirac equation. Oppenheimer impressed him so much that he changed his plans and went to work with Oppenheimer at the University of California, Berkeley. This was the beginning of their life-long friendship. At Berkeley, Oppenheimer and Serber published a series of papers together on a wide range of topics, including cosmic rays, nuclear physics, and astrophysics. In one such paper, Oppenheimer and Serber examined the minimum mass for a neutron core, below which its internal pressure could make it explode. They also showed that the Sun could not possess such a neutron core and its source energy must be elsewhere. (Hans Bethe and Charles Critchfield demonstrated that nuclear fusion was that source of energy.) This paper was prompted by the work of Lev Davidovich Landau, in what was essentially an exercise in nuclear physics and gravitation. This was one of the papers that established the foundation for the general-relativistic theory of stellar structure.

In 1938, Serber received an offer of an assistant professorship at the University of Illinois in Urbana–Champaign. While he initially wanted to stay at Berkeley with Oppenheimer, Isidor Rabi persuaded him to "cut the umbilical cord" with Oppenheimer and seize one of the few opportunities available to Jewish students at the time. Serber agreed and relocated to Urbana in September that year.

In late December, 1941, just a few weeks after the Japanese air raid on Pearl Harbor, Oppenheimer visited Serber in Urbana and recruited him for the Manhattan Project. Oppenheimer recounted to Ernest Lawrence that Serber was one of the few "first-rate" theorists he had ever worked it.

== Manhattan Project ==
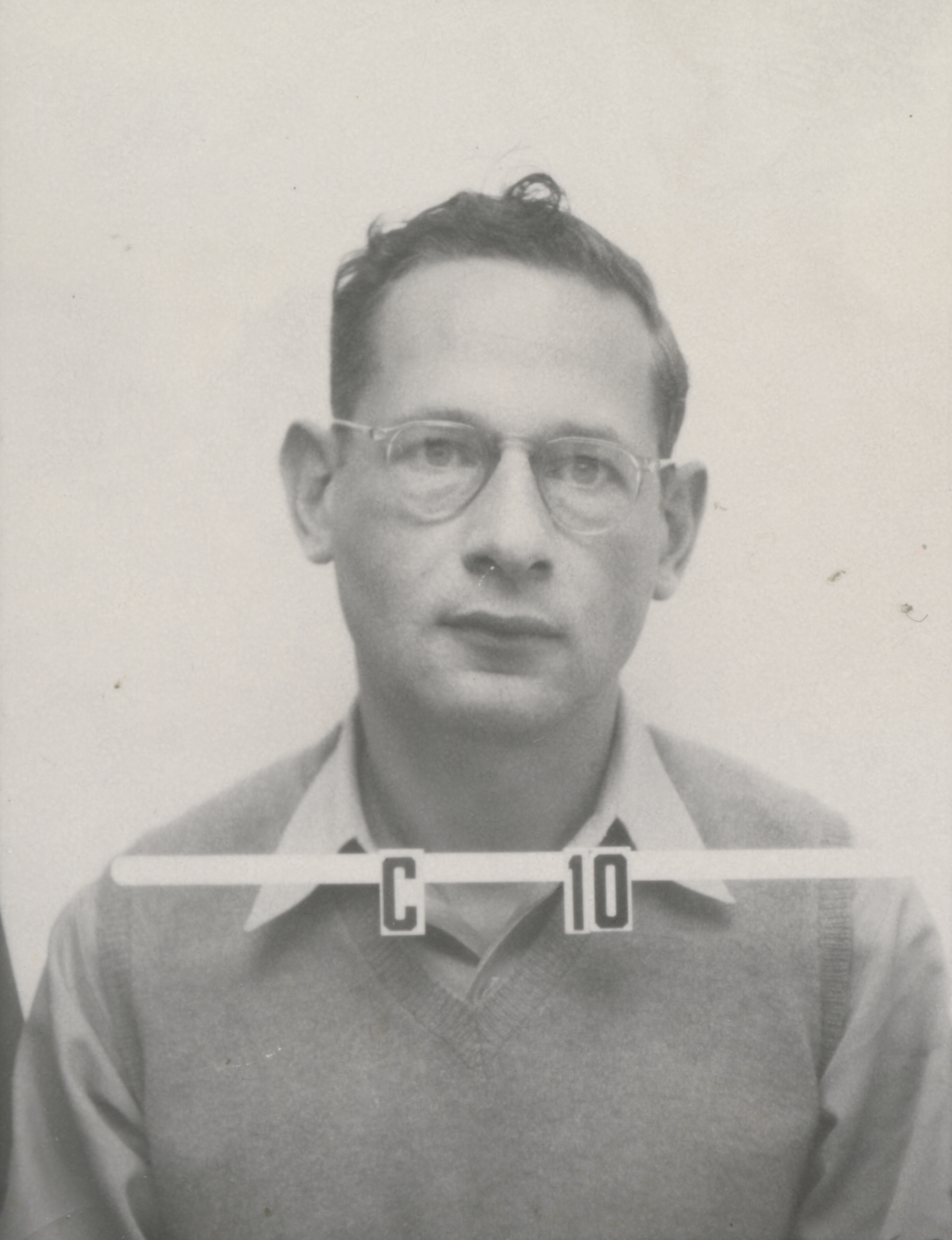
Robert Serber's Los Alamos badge

He was recruited for the Manhattan Project in 1941, and was in Project Alberta on the dropping of the bomb. When the Los Alamos National Laboratory was first organized, Oppenheimer decided not to compartmentalize the technical information among different departments. This boosted the technical workers' effectiveness in problem-solving and underscored the project's urgency, as they now understood its significance. Consequently, Serber was tasked with delivering a series of lectures to explain the basic principles and objectives of the project. These lectures were printed and supplied to all incoming scientific staff, and became known as The Los Alamos Primer, LA-1. It was declassified in 1965. Serber developed the first good theory of bomb assembly hydrodynamics.

Serber's wife Charlotte Serber was appointed by Oppenheimer to head the technical library at Los Alamos, where she was the only wartime female section leader.

Serber created the code-names for all three design projects, the "Little Boy" (uranium gun), "Thin Man" (plutonium gun), and "Fat Man" (plutonium implosion), according to his reminiscences (1998). The names were based on their design shapes; the "Thin Man" would be a very long device, and the name came from the Dashiell Hammett detective novel and series of movies of the same name; the "Fat Man" bomb would be round and fat and was named after Sydney Greenstreet's character in The Maltese Falcon (from Hammett's novel). "Little Boy" would come last and be named only to contrast to the "Thin Man" bomb. This differs from the unsupported, abandoned theory that "Fat Man" was named after Churchill and "Thin Man" after Roosevelt.

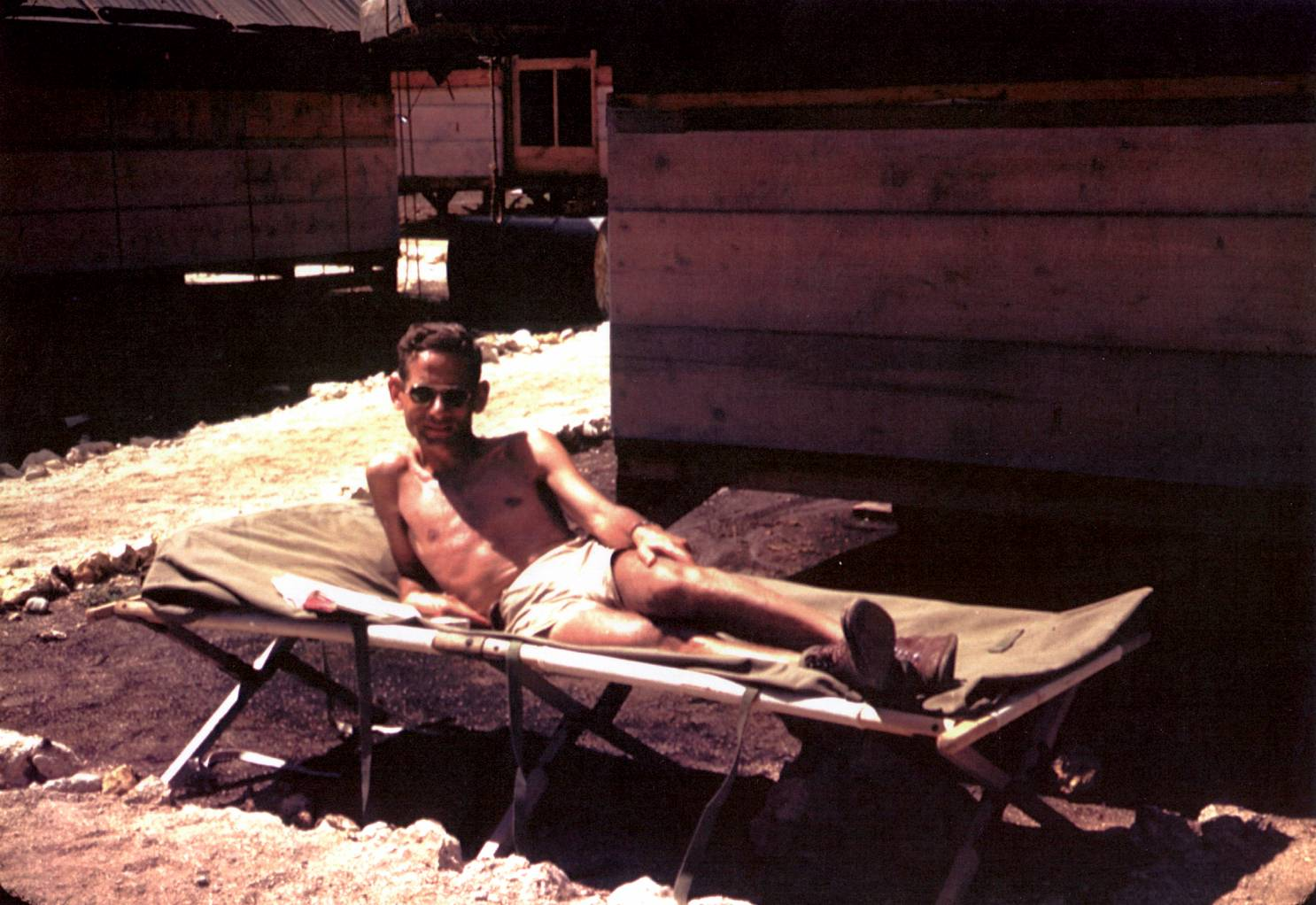
Serber on Tinian in 1945, just before the bombings of Hiroshima and Nagasaki

After receiving an identification card noting that his civilian noncombatant duties were commensurate in profile to the Army of the United States rank of colonel (an administrative designation only ostensibly valid if he were captured as a prisoner of war under the 1929 Geneva Convention, although he was frequently afforded salutations and other perquisites of the rank in practice by military personnel while traveling), Serber was to go on Big Stink, the camera plane for the Nagasaki mission, as a technical advisor; however, it left without him when group operations officer Major James I. Hopkins ordered him off the plane because he had forgotten his parachute, reportedly after the B-29 had already taxied onto the runway. Since Serber was the only crew member who knew how to operate the high-speed camera, Hopkins had to be instructed by radio from Tinian on its use. Serber was with the first American team to enter Hiroshima and Nagasaki to assess the results of the atomic bombing of the two cities.

== Post-war work and personal life ==
Although Oppenheimer sought an appointment for Serber in the Berkeley physics department following the end of the war, this was soon forestalled, possibly because of the anti-Semitism of department chair Raymond Thayer Birge. Birge had previously refused to offer a tenure-track appointment to Serber after he received his University of Illinois offer, opining that "one Jew in the department is enough." Oppenheimer prevailed in placing him as head of the theoretical division of the Berkeley Radiation Laboratory under Ernest Lawrence; however, as his mentor segued into policy consultancies and the presidency of the Institute for Advanced Study in 1947, Serber frequently took over his courses, ultimately resulting in his appointment to the Berkeley faculty. There, he gave weekly lectures on the latest advances in particle physics. One graduate students took the notes and had them printed as a book titled Serber Says (1987).

During the late 1940s, Serber studied the physics of accelerators, the synchrotron. He attended the famous 1947 Shelter Island Conference near Long Island, New York, and its follow-up in Ponoco Manor, Pennsylvania, in 1948, and Oldstone, New York, in 1949. In 1948, Serber had to defend himself against anonymous accusations of disloyalty, mostly because his wife Charlotte's family were Jewish intellectuals with socialist leanings, and also because he tried to remove politics from discussions of the feasibility of the fusion bomb, leading to arguments with Edward Teller. There was some speculation that Serber was a member of the Communist Party. Oppenheimer said it was possible he was member, but did not know, whereas the FBI concluded that "no definite evidence is known" for his membership. Although he had been cleared of any potential wrongdoing at a subsequent hearing that year, he was denied a prerequisite security clearance for a Japanese physics conference in 1952, precipitating his refusal to join a Teller-chaired Department of Defense advisory group.

While he reluctantly signed the loyalty oath stipulated by the Levering Act for Berkeley personnel in 1950, growing antagonism between Oppenheimer and the more conservative Lawrence eventually spurred his departure. In 1951, he became a professor of physics at Columbia University at the behest of Manhattan Project colleague I. I. Rabi. He regularly visited the Brookhaven National Laboratory in Long Island, New York, and was one of the most influential theorists there.

Working on quantum field theory during the late 1950s and early 1960s, Serber assisted Murray Gell-Mann in his discovery of quarks by studying the symmetry group SU(3). Although largely bereft of any ideology, he refused to join the Defense Department-affiliated JASON consulting group because of his previous clearance issues and opposition to the Vietnam War.

Serber was one of the speakers at a memorial service for his late friend J. Robert Oppenheimer held in the District of Columbia in the spring of 1967 by the American Physical Society (APS). He subsequently served as president of the APS in 1971. A year later, Serber was awarded the J. Robert Oppenheimer Memorial Prize in recognition of his many contributions to theoretical physics. He became the chairman of the Department of Physics at Columbia University in 1975 and retired three years later.

== Personal life and death ==
After being diagnosed with Parkinson's disease, Charlotte Serber suffered from depression and committed suicide in 1967. Serber then entered a relationship with Kitty Oppenheimer; they moved in together. She talked him into buying a 52-foot (16 m) yawl, which they sailed from New York to Grenada. In 1972, they purchased a 52-foot (16 m) ketch, with the intention of sailing through the Panama Canal and to Japan via the Galapagos Islands and Tahiti during Serber's sabbatical. They set out, but Kitty became ill, and was taken to Gorgas Hospital, where she died of an embolism on October 27, 1972. Serber and Toni Oppenheimer scattered her cremains near the Oppenheimers' longtime vacation home in Saint John, U.S. Virgin Islands, which he continued to use.

Following his retirement, he married Fiona St. Clair, a fabric designer from Saint Thomas, U.S. Virgin Islands, in 1979. He adopted her son Zachariah, and they had another son, William, in November 1980.

In May 1997, Serber proofread the draft of his autobiography, Peace and War: Reminiscences of a Life on the Frontiers of Science, which was to be published the following year. Serber died June 1, 1997, at his home in Manhattan from complications of surgery for brain cancer. He was 88 years old.

== In popular culture ==
Serber appears in the Oscar-nominated documentary The Day After Trinity (1980). He was portrayed by Peter Whiteman in the 1980 BBC series Oppenheimer and by Michael Angarano in Christopher Nolan's 2023 film Oppenheimer.
