= Frances Serber =

Ukrainian-American ceramicist and muralist

Frances Serber (1895-1978) was a Ukrainian-American ceramicist and muralist. She, along with William Soini, developed a glaze technique that led to the production of brilliantly colored functional and decorative "Stonelain" wares at low cost.

== Early life and teaching ==
Serber was born Frances Leof on 3 Sept 1895, to a Jewish family in Ekaterinoslav, Russia (now Dnipro, Ukraine), the oldest of four children. As a child, she and her siblings watched from their basement window as a Cossack speared a mother and her baby, according to her nephew Eugene Bernard Schwartz Leof. The family emigrated to the United States in 1906 to escape pogroms. She was 11 years old when the family arrived in the country under the sponsorship of an uncle, Dr. Morris V. Leof, a doctor who had emigrated some years earlier.

On 21 Dec 1919, Serber married Samuel H Levison in Atlantic City, a Penn Dental School graduate. He was born on 10 Apr 1892 in Trenton, NJ. Unfortunately, five years later on 14 Oct 1925 he died of influenza-related pneumonia at Pennsylvania Hospital in Philadelphia.

In Philadelphia in 1928 she married David Serber, father of Robert Serber who was second to Robert Oppenheimer on the Manhattan Project.

Serber attended the Pennsylvania Museum and School of Industrial Art (now the University of the Arts), where in 1930 she won second prize in pottery by the bequest of Mrs. Charles F. Judson.

In 1957, she was hired by the Pennsylvania Academy of the Fine Arts to teach ceramic sculpture and clay modeling. In that year's annual report, the academy noted that it was fortunate to have hired the “exemplary” Serber. She taught evening classes at the school at least until 1961.

Serber taught at Alfred University and as an adjunct art teacher at the Moore College of Art. She was also a lecturer at the Festival House School in Lenox, Massachusetts in 1959 where she discussed the sculptures she had done in churches and synagogues.

== Stonelain ==
In 1950, Serber and Finnish ceramicist William Soini created a glaze technique that combined the durability of stoneware with the texture of porcelain. It was developed in the laboratories of the Associated American Artists in New York. Serber and Soini produced glazes in such colors of peacock blue and oxblood (sang de boeuf) that were used in pieces designed by artists. The process fitted neatly into Associated's mission of providing affordable art – the group started with prints - for the middle class.

Serber, Soini, and other well-known painters, sculptors and ceramists designed pieces sold by Associated under the label "Stonelain." High fired, the pieces were touted for their brilliant colors. Sold in department stores, they included vases, bowls, ashtrays, cigarette boxes, pitchers, tiles and American folklore figurines. They were signed by the artists, and bore an engraved outline of artist Gwen Lux's "Ubangi" pitcher with the word "Stonelain" and an intertwined “SS” for Serber and Soini. The various artists worked in teams: ceramicists made the pottery in kilns, sculptors supplied the form and painters created the decorations.

== As a Ceramicist ==
Serber considered her best work a mural titled “The History of Shelter” in the lobby of the 2601 Parkway apartment building in Philadelphia. With New York painter Nicholas Marsicano in 1940, she built a tile mural measuring 144 feet long and 4 ½ feet wide that ran along the top of the walls of the lobby. At the time, the elegant apartment building was the third largest in the country and the largest in Philadelphia. In ads, the owners touted the ceramic murals among the enticements for renters.

A photo of the mural is included in Eleanor Bittermann's 1952 book "Art in Modern Architecture." She wrote that the 12 panels of tiles produced a silhouette effect reminiscent of Gothic stained glass, notable for their technical rather than aesthetic quality.

“I wanted a feeling of stained glass,” Serber wrote in a letter to the Fairmount Park Commission in 1973. It was seeking her advice on which of her works to use in a new book. “The tiles were not cut in random. We wanted some sort of design. After working twenty hours a day for six months the mural was finished on the promised date. The mural was born!” Serber and Marsicano designed and fired the tiles in her studio. “It was the first of its kind and it began to lift ceramics from Craft into Art form. It was the first time a woman undertook such a commission, and it was the first mural of its kind. Picasso, years later as you know, began to do ceramics and of course that definitely put ceramics in its Art form.”

In several articles starting as far back as 1938, she was described as a “craftsman,” not an artist.

Serber was one of three professional women prominently shown in a photo display titled “Women Whose Jobs Make News Headlines” in The Philadelphia Inquirer in 1939. Her photo bore the title “World-Famous Hands.” She was described as an internationally famous ceramics artist whose pottery was exhibited worldwide. She chose clay as a medium, the newspaper stated, as a means of expressing herself artistically.

She had studios in Philadelphia and Newark, NJ, where she worked on fabricating a mural for Cuba and whose opening in 1946 was noted in the New York Times. She was identified as a New York and Philadelphia artist. She opened the studio with artist Hugh Mesibov. Serber supported herself through commissions, mostly from architectural firms, and financial help from her brothers.

== Commissions and exhibitions ==
Serber produced ceramic-tile designs for buildings in several cities. They include:

- Philadelphia Health Center, “A Mythological interpretation of Outer Space.” Serber entered a photo of this installation in a Philadelphia Art Alliance exhibit in 1965 that featured 39 artists and about 50 architects from the Philadelphia area. A reviewer noted that the mural melded Chinese, baroque and Mayan styles.
- Congregation Rodeph Shalom synagogue, “Jacob’s Dream,” 1965. Another of her entries in the Art Alliance exhibit was a photo of a mural at the synagogue. The reviewer noted that it resembled a drawing.
- St. Mary's Church, Sioux Falls, South Dakota. She created the floor tiles. The project was entered in the 1960 National Gold Medal Exhibition of the Building Arts sponsored by the Architectural League of New York. The exhibit traveled for two years in the United States and Canada.
- Deborah Hospital, Rogosin Heart Pavilion, Brownsville, NJ, 1966. She produced a mural in the Tree of Life room. It was a ceramic tile image measuring 14 feet long and 10 feet high and depicting the creation of life.
- Auriesville Shrine of the North American Martyrs (now Our Lady of Martyrs Shrine), Auriesville, NY, Shrine Dining Hall, 1963. Serber created two murals depicting the saints coming to Auriesville and the vision of Saint Isaac Joques during his captivity by the Mohawks. She produced 74 tiles of Native American symbols, along with eight shields of the martyr saints and the Indian woman Kateri Tekakwitha.
- Lewis Tower Building lobby, Philadelphia, 1959. Serber was hired to decorate the enlarged lobby with tile and marble. The renovated building has been renamed the Aria Condos.
- 19th-century firefighting scene at a fire station, Northeast Philadelphia.
- Ceramic tile of eagle, American Legion Playground, Northeast Philadelphia.
- Pair of ceramic lamps for Elsie de Wolfe, considered the first interior designer in the United States, known for outfitting the homes of the country's elite starting in the early 1900s.

For several years, Serber participated in the prestigious National Ceramics Exhibition organized by the Syracuse Museum of Art in New York. In 1936, she was represented in the juried show with a gray bowl. In the 1939 show, she submitted a plate and a hand-thrown bowl with majolica decoration. In the 1957 show, her entry was an oval stoneware bowl.

At the exhibition's 1946 competition, she submitted a stoneware panel called “Hoeing” as well as a stoneware plate. The image for the panel came from a painting by her longtime friend Robert Gwathmey, a social realist artist who was well known for painting non-stereotypical images of Southern Blacks. Serber produced several ceramic plates with Gwathmey's images, including “End of Day.” In his one-man show in 1946 at the ACA Gallery in New York, Gwathmey presented reproductions of two of her ceramic pieces.

== Advocate for Philadelphia artists ==
Serber was active with the Philadelphia chapter of Artists Equity Association, a group of professional artists founded in 1949, two years after the national group. The group was instrumental in developing a policy requiring that one percent of all new construction costs for city buildings and redevelopment projects be set aside for fine art.

She was on the board and served two terms as president of Artists Equity. She and several other former presidents were noticeably absent from a 1999 exhibit held by a re-formed Artists Equity group, as one reviewer noted.

Serber often complained that local artists were not properly recognized, forcing many to head to New York where they received a warmer reception from museums and galleries. In 1963, she accused the Philadelphia Museum of Art of disrespecting Philadelphia artists by excluding them from its “Collectors Exhibit” of 20th Century art. In 1967, she was embroiled in a controversy surrounding an art festival that, she said, disallowed professional artists from participating in the planning and submitting works. As Equity president, she was among the members who boycotted the festival.

On the 17th anniversary of founding of the local Equity, she was among 38 members who opened their studios in the city and the suburbs to the public in 1966. In a newspaper article, she was shown in her studio working on a ceramic plaque. She had recently completed a mural at John Welsh public school. Her studio was a barn with a kiln on the second floor and sleeping quarters on the first.

Serber was a member of the United American Artists (UAA) labor union, as was Marsicano. Both were mentioned as creators of the 2601 mural in a news story about UAA's national exhibit in 1940 in New York.

== Political participation ==
In 1937, Serber donated pottery to the UAA forerunner, the Artists Union, to raise funds for medical aid to Spanish Loyalists.

During the 1940s, she was active in protests involving local and federal officials and Communist organizations. In 1940, she signed a petition to protest a federal raid on the headquarters of the Communist Party and the International Workers Office in Philadelphia. The signers, including Marsicano, called the raid a threat to the Bill of Rights, contending that people were not allowed to call their attorneys and documents were seized that were not in the search warrant. The petition was read into the Congressional Record.

In 1941, she headed a committee in charge of an auction to raise money for the Philadelphia Committee for People's Rights Campaign to Defend the Bill of Rights. Also that year, she was among the members of the same group who met with the Philadelphia police chief to protest the arrests of petitioners soliciting signatures to place Communist Party candidates on the Pennsylvania ballot. Serber, treasurer of the group, and the three women accompanying her said they were not interested in the Communist Party but in civil liberties. She was president of the Philadelphia Citizens Committee to Free Earl Browder in 1942. The committee sent a telegram to President Roosevelt congratulating him for commuting Browder's sentence on passport violations.

While Artists Equity president in 1966, she was the contact person for a project to sell donated artwork to raise money for artists in Florence, Italy, which had been devastated by flooding. In 1968, she organized a fundraiser for the campaign of Sen. Eugene McCarthy (no relation to Joseph McCarthy) whereby artists donated paintings, prints and sculptures for sale.

== Personal ==
In 1928, Serber married attorney David Serber, a widower with three children. His oldest, Robert Serber, became an assistant to J. Robert Oppenheimer on the Manhattan Project, which developed the atomic bomb at the Los Alamos Laboratory in New Mexico in the early 1940s. Robert's wife Charlotte Serber née Leof, Frances’ cousin, was librarian at the facility.

By 1973, Serber had moved to Cuernavaca, Morelos, Mexico, where she died in 1978 at age 84. Her works are in many private collections.

== Collections ==
San Diego Museum of Art

St. Joseph's University, Philadelphia

== Exhibitions ==
Syracuse Museum of Art, 1936, 1939, 1946, 1957

Philadelphia Art Alliance, 1938, 1939, 1942, 1965

Y. M. & Y. W. H. A., Philadelphia, 1938

ACA Gallery (in Robert Gwathmey's exhibit), 1946

Museum of Contemporary Arts, 1960

Stanford University Museum of Art, 1984
