= Philip Beckley =

British physicist, author, and lecturer

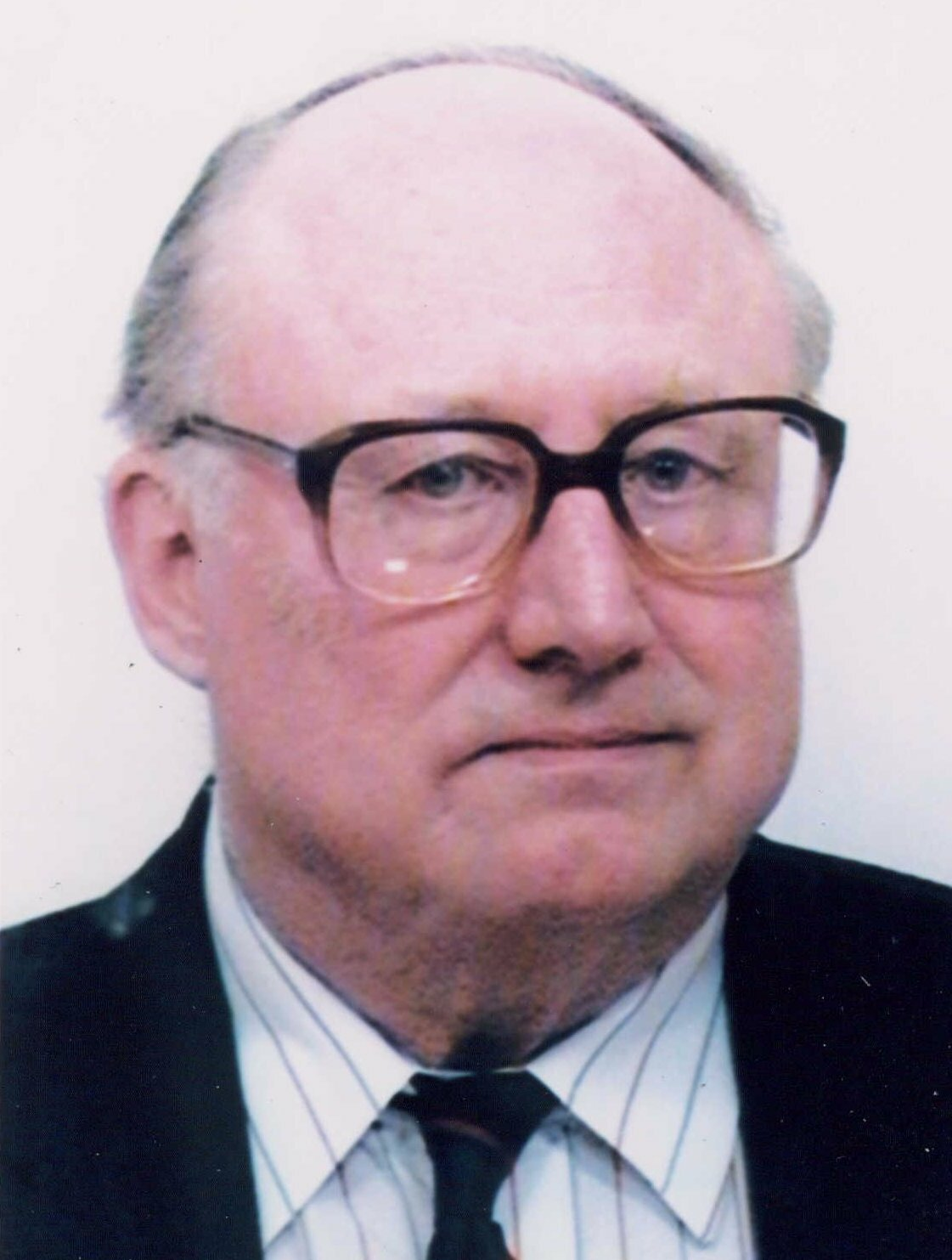
Philip Beckley

Philip Beckley (born 25 May 1936) is a British physicist, author, and lecturer.

== Education and career details ==
Beckley attended Monmouth School, followed by the University of Southampton, which he graduated from with general honors. He got his PhD degree from Cardiff University in 1969, and his D.Sc. degree in 1972. He is a fellow of the Institute of Physics, the Institute of Metals, and the Institution of Electrical Engineers. He is a senior member of the Institute of Electrical and Electronics Engineers.

== Awards and prizes ==
- 1968 – City and Guilds Insignia Award (for his thesis "Sensors for Automation")
- 1989 – Honorary chairman, American Society of Metals (Magnetics)
- 1970 – Fellow of Institution of Radio and Electronic Engineers (now absorbed into I.E.E.)
- 1995 – Stokowiec prize and medal for work on high alloy silicon steels
- 1997 – Appointed visiting Professor (Electrical Engineering) at University College Cardiff
- 1998 – John Wilkinson Medal, Staffs ISI.
- 2006 – IEC Special Centenary Award for his contributions to Electrotechnical Standards Activities

== Publications and patents ==
Beckley published more than 85 scientific papers covering aspects of magnetic materials, production methods, physics of electrotechnical steels, magnetic measuring systems, etc.

=== Books ===
- P. Beckley, Electrical Steels – a handbook for producers and users, European Electrical Steels, Newport, UK 2000, ISBN 0-9540039-0-X
- P. Beckley, Electrical Steels for Rotating Machines, Institution of Electrical Engineers, London, UK, 2002, ISBN 0-85296-980-5
- P. Beckley, The Effective Engineer, 2008, Newport, UK, ISBN 978-0-9556552-0-3

=== Patents ===
- P. Beckley, Production of grain oriented steel, UK Patent 4652316, 24 March 1987
- P. Beckley, Measurement of magnetic properties of electrical steels using a search coil partially defined by a fluid electrolyte, US Patent 5365170, 15 November 1994
- Z. Soghomonian, H. Stanbury, P. Beckley, A. Moses, Hardness testing of steels, International Patent W095/12821, May 1998
- G. Woodman, D. Snell, P. Beckley, Coating apparatus, US Patent 6277196, 21 August 2001

=== Major scientific articles ===
- P. Beckley, et al., Impact of surface coating insulation on small motor performance, IEE Proceedings, Electrical Power Applications, Vol. 145, No 5, September 1998, pp. 409–413 (Invited Paper)
- P. Beckley, P. C. Y. Ling, The challenge of higher frequencies to solid steels, Invited paper, Illinois Institute of Technology, Magnetic Materials Conference, April 1999
- P. Beckley, Modern steels for transformers and machines, Invited paper for IEE Power Engineering Journal, 1999
- Z.Soghomonian, P. Beckley, A. Moses, On-line hardness assessment of CRML steels, American Society of Materials Conference, Chicago, October 1996
- P. Beckley, J. Z. Cao, G. H. Shirkoohi, Cross section, thickness and approach to ferromagnetic saturation, Illinois Institute of Technology, Soft Magnetic Materials Conference, May 1998
- P. Beckley, Industrial magnetic measurements, Invited paper given at SMM 14, September 1999
- P. Beckley, M. Arikat, Continuous Assessment of steel cross sectional area by a resistivity method, IIT Conference, Chicago, May 1996
- P. Beckley, Safety Systems for lifting Magnets, IIT Conference, Chicago, May 2000,
- P. Beckley, Single Sided Power Loss Testers, IIT Conference, May 2001
- P . Beckley, Composite teeth for large alternators, I.I.T. Conference, Chicago, May 2004
- P. Beckley, Magnet assessment of Austenite in high alloy steels, EMSA Conference, Cardiff, July 2004
