= PCGM =

PCGM may refer to:

- Political correctness gone mad
- Preconditioned conjugate gradient method
- Pacific Coast Gravity Meeting
