= Shelter Island Conference =

Major meeting of American physicists led by Robert Oppenheimer in 1947

Shelter Island Conference (1947)
- Date: June 2–4, 1947
- Venue: Ram’s Head Inn
- Location: Shelter Island, New York; 41.079756°N 72.294148°W
- Type: Academic conference
- Theme: Quantum mechanics
- Organised by: National Academy of Sciences

The first Shelter Island Conference on the foundations of quantum mechanics was held from June 2–4, 1947 at the Ram's Head Inn in Shelter Island, New York. Shelter Island was the first major opportunity since Pearl Harbor and the Manhattan Project for the leaders of the American physics community to gather after the war. As Julian Schwinger would later recall, "It was the first time that people who had all this physics pent up in them for five years could talk to each other without somebody peering over their shoulders and saying, 'Is this cleared?'"

The conference, which cost $850, was followed by the Pocono Conference of 1948 and the Oldstone Conference of 1949. They were arranged with the assistance of J. Robert Oppenheimer and the National Academy of Sciences (NAS). Later Oppenheimer deemed Shelter Island the most successful scientific meeting he had ever attended; and as Richard Feynman recalled to Jagdish Mehra in April 1970: "There have been many conferences in the world since, but I've never felt any to be as important as this.... The Shelter Island Conference was my first conference with the big men.... I had never gone to one like this in peacetime."

== Organization ==
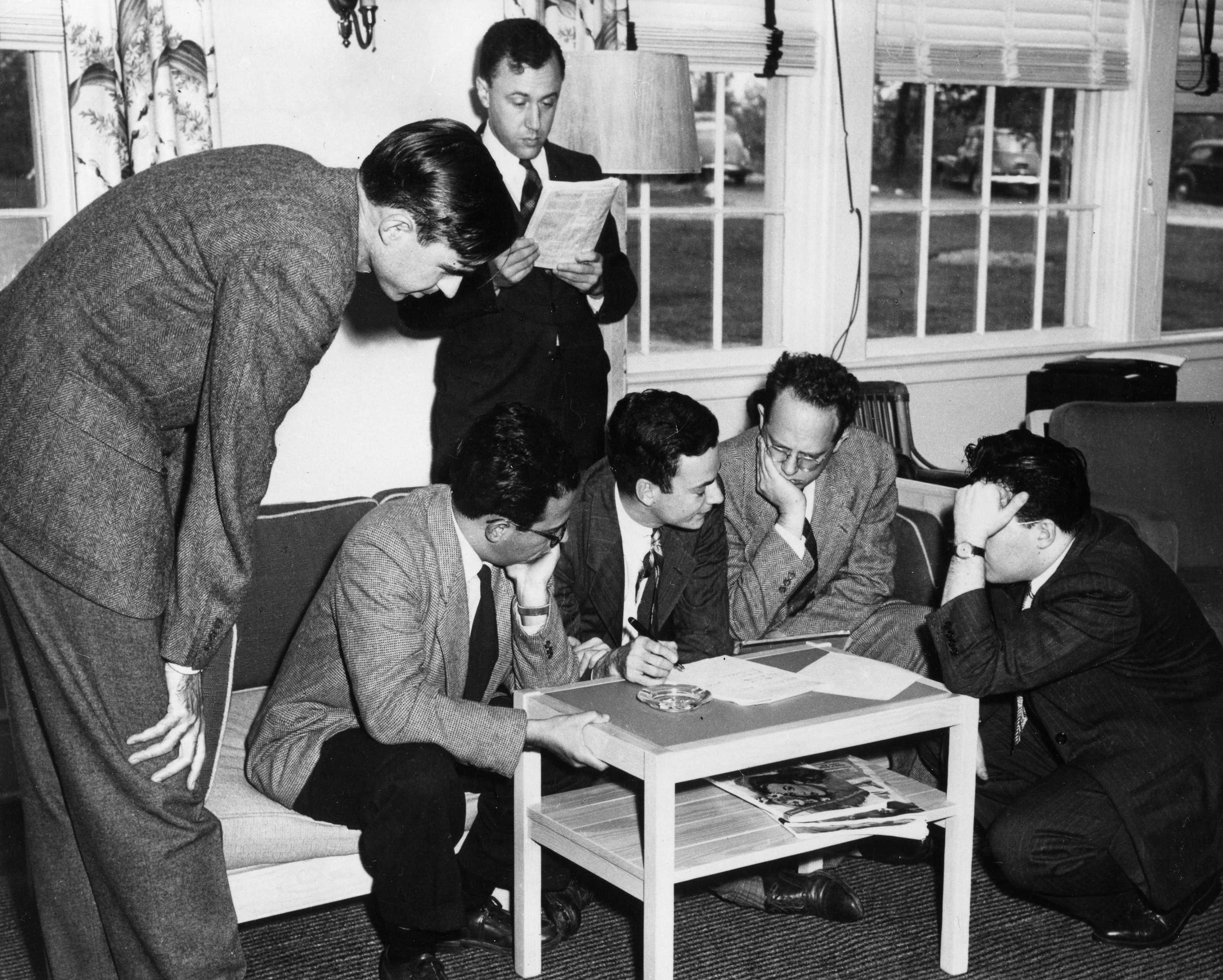
Picture of Willis Lamb, Abraham Pais, Richard Feynman, John A. Wheeler, Herman Feshbach and Julian Schwinger discussing during the Shelter Island Conference.

The conference was conceived by Duncan A. MacInnes, a electrochemistry researcher at the Rockefeller Institute for Medical Research. Once the president of the New York Academy of Sciences, MacInnes had already organized a number of small scientific conferences. However, he believed that the later conferences had suffered from a bloated attendance, and over this issue, he resigned from the academy in January 1945. That fall, he approached the NAS with the idea of a series of 2–3 day conferences limited to 20–25 people. Frank Jewett, the head of the NAS, liked the idea; he envisioned a "meeting at some quiet place where the men could live together intimately", possibly "at an inn somewhere", and suggested that MacInnes focus on a couple of pilot programs. MacInnes' first choice was "The Nature of Biopotentials", a subject close to his own heart; the second would be "The Postulates of Quantum Mechanics", which later became "Foundations of Quantum Mechanics".

Karl K. Darrow, a theoretical physicist at Bell Labs and secretary of the American Physical Society, offered his help in organizing the quantum mechanics conference. The two decided to try to emulate the success of the early Solvay Conferences, and they consulted with Léon Brillouin, who had some experience in that area. In turn, Brillouin suggested consulting Wolfgang Pauli, the recent Nobel medalist at the Institute for Advanced Study in Princeton.

In January 1946, MacInnes, Darrow, Brillouin, and Pauli met in New York and exchanged letters. Pauli was enthusiastic about the topic, but he was primarily interested in bringing together the international physics community after the ordeal of the war. He suggested a large conference, including many older, foreign physicists, much to MacInnes' chagrin. With Jewett's encouragement, MacInnes asked Pauli for suggestions of "younger men" such as John Archibald Wheeler, explaining that the Rockefeller Foundation would support only a small conference. Pauli and Wheeler replied that MacInnes' conference might be merged with Niels Bohr's conference on Wave Mechanics in Denmark in 1947; they pointed out that the Niels Bohr Institute had close ties with the Rockefeller Foundation anyway. Darrow wrote to Wheeler that Bohr's conference was a poor replacement because it would draw few Americans. Finally, Shelter Island was explicitly an American conference. Darrow was chairman of the conference.

== Proceedings ==
=== Lamb shift ===
Willis Lamb had found when probing hydrogen atoms with microwave beams that one of the two possible quantum states had slightly more energy than predicted by the Dirac theory; this became known as the Lamb shift. Lamb had discovered the shift a few weeks before (with Robert Retherford), so this was a major talking point at the conference. As it was known that the Dirac theory was incomplete, the small difference was an indication that quantum electrodynamics (QED) was progressing.

=== Electron magnetic moment ===
Another dramatic discovery was reported at the conference by Isidor Rabi; a precise measurement of the magnetic moment of the electron, though this was overshadowed by Lamb's work.

=== Mesons ===
Marshak presented his two-meson hypothesis about the pi-meson, which were discovered shortly thereafter.

=== QED ===
Richard Feynman gave an informal presentation about his work on quantum electrodynamics. He gave a more formal, and less successful, presentation on QED at the Pocono Conference next year.

== Participants ==
The participants arrived Sunday evening, 1 June 1947, and left Wednesday evening. They were:

- Hans Bethe
- David Bohm
- Gregory Breit
- Karl K. Darrow
- Herman Feshbach
- Richard Feynman
- Hendrik Kramers
- Willis Lamb
- Duncan A. MacInnes
- Robert Eugene Marshak
- John von Neumann
- Arnold Nordsieck
- J. Robert Oppenheimer
- Abraham Pais
- Linus Pauling
- Isidor Isaac Rabi
- Bruno Rossi
- Julian Schwinger
- Robert Serber
- Edward Teller
- George Uhlenbeck
- John Hasbrouck Van Vleck
- Victor Frederick Weisskopf
- John Archibald Wheeler

== See also ==
- Solvay Conference
- Washington Conference on Theoretical Physics (November 1947)
- Chapel Hill Conference
- Texas Symposium on Relativistic Astrophysics
- List of physics conferences
