= David Jiles =

British engineer and academic

David Collingwood Jiles FInstP FIEE FIET FIMA FIMMM FLSW (born 28 September 1953) is the Anson Marston Distinguished Professor of Engineering and holder of the Palmer Endowed Department Chair in Electrical and Computer Engineering at Iowa State University.

== Career ==
Born in London, Jiles received a BSc from the University of Exeter (1975), followed by a MSc from the University of Birmingham (1976), a PhD from the University of Hull (1979), and a DSc from the University of Birmingham (1990). Jiles was formerly Professor of Magnetics at Cardiff University and the director of the Wolfson Centre for Magnetics there from 2005 to 2010. Prior to that, he had been at Iowa State as Anson Marston Distinguished Professor of Engineering. Jiles was named a Jefferson Fellow at the United States Department of State in January 2016, a post that is set to begin in August and last for one year.

== Honors ==
He has been the editor-in-chief of IEEE Transactions on Magnetics since 2005. He is a Fellow of the American Physical Society, the Institute of Electrical and Electronics Engineers, the Institution of Electrical Engineers, the Institute of Physics, the Institute of Materials, the Institute of Mathematics and its Applications, the Magnetics Society, and the Royal Academy of Engineering. He was elected a Fellow of the Learned Society of Wales in 2016.

== Personal ==
He raised money for United Way of America's Story County branch with a blindfolded chess tournament in 2013.

== Publications ==
=== Books ===
- Introduction to Magnetism and Magnetic Materials, London and New York: Chapman and Hall Publishers,. (in 535 libraries according to WorldCat) 1st edition 1991. 2nd edition 1998.
  - Review, Choice, v29 n05
- Introduction to the Electronic Properties of Materials, London and New York: Chapman and Hall Publishers,. First edition 1994. Second edition 2001.
- Introduction to the Principles of Materials Evaluation, Boca Raton, Florida: CRC Press, 2007.

== See also ==
- Jiles–Atherton model
