= Anatol Odzijewicz =

Polish mathematician and physicist

- Born: October 6, 1947; Orla, Poland
- Died: April 18, 2022 (aged 74); Białowieża, Poland
- Citizenship: Polish
- Education: Warsaw University
- Scientific career
- Fields: Mathematical physics
- Workplaces: Warsaw University; University of Białystok
- Doctoral advisor: es:Bogdan Mielnik

Anatol Odzijewicz (November 10, 1947 – April 18, 2022)[ was Polish mathematician and physicist. The main areas of his research were the theory of Banach groupoids and algebroids related to the structure of W*-algebras, quantization of physical systems by means of the coherent state map, as well as quantum and classical integrable systems.

Anatol Odzijewicz was also a social activist. He founded a branch of the Society for the Preservation of Monuments in Białystok and chaired it for many years. He was the founder of the open-air museum in Białowieża.

== Career ==
In the years 1975-1979 Odzijewicz was employed at Warsaw University. Since 1979 Odzijewicz was working at University of Białystok (till 1997 it was a branch of Warsaw University). In the years 1997-2005 he was the dean of the Faculty of Mathematics and Physics, and from 2008 to 2016 - the dean of the Faculty of Mathematics and Computer Science, University of Białystok. He was also the director of the Institute of Mathematics (2005-2008 and 2016-2019). He founded and was leading a group of researchers working in the area of mathematical physics.

He was also a founder and main organizer of the conference series Workshop on Geometric Methods in Physics.

== Selected publications ==
- Odzijewicz, Anatol (1 March 1998). "Quantum Algebras and q-Special Functions Related to Coherent States Maps of the Disc". Communications in Mathematical Physics. 192 (1): 183–215. Bibcode:1998CMaPh.192..183O. doi:10.1007/s002200050296. S2CID 121348345.
- Odzijewicz, Anatol (December 1988). "On reproducing kernels and quantization of states". Communications in Mathematical Physics. 114 (4): 577–597. Bibcode:1988CMaPh.114..577O. doi:10.1007/BF01229456. S2CID 123138009.
- Odzijewicz, Anatol (1 November 1992). "Coherent states and geometric quantization". Communications in Mathematical Physics. 150 (2): 385–413. Bibcode:1992CMaPh.150..385O. doi:10.1007/BF02096666. S2CID 120580313.
- Odzijewicz, Anatol; Horowski, Maciej; Tereszkiewicz, Agnieszka (25 May 2001). "Integrable multi-boson systems and orthogonal polynomials". Journal of Physics A: Mathematical and General. 34 (20): 4353–4376. arXiv:math-ph/0101013. Bibcode:2001JPhA...34.4353O. doi:10.1088/0305-4470/34/20/308. S2CID 119568710.
- Odzijewicz, Anatol; Ratiu, Tudor S. (1 November 2003). "Banach Lie-Poisson Spaces and Reduction". Communications in Mathematical Physics. 243 (1): 1–54. arXiv:math/0210207. Bibcode:2003CMaPh.243....1O. doi:10.1007/s00220-003-0948-8. S2CID 17001421.
- Dobrogowska, Alina; Odzijewicz, Anatol (15 August 2006). "Second order q-difference equations solvable by factorization method". Journal of Computational and Applied Mathematics. 193 (1): 319–346. arXiv:math-ph/0312057. doi:10.1016/j.cam.2005.06.009. S2CID 119678648.
