= International Workshop on 1 & 2 Dimensional Magnetic Measurement and Testing =

International Workshop on 1 & 2 Dimensional Magnetic Measurement and Testing (commonly referred to as 1&2DM or even 2DM) - international meeting devoted to problems in one- and two-directional magnetisation of ferromagnetic materials.

== Scope ==
- Basic problems, magnetisation processes, domain structures, Barkhausen noise
- Aspects of industrial testing and standardisation
- Power loss, polarisation, magnetostriction and anisotropy measurement
- Magnetisation systems and sensors for 1 and 2D measurements
- High frequency related aspects
- B and H vector relationships and their interpretation
- Relevance to applications (e.g., electrical machines, transformers, etc.).
- Modelling of magnetic properties of materials, relevance of microstructures

From the 8th 1&2DM the technical papers written in English are published in Przegląd Elektrotechniczny (which in Polish means Electric Review) issued in Warsaw, Poland. Przegląd Elektrotechniczny is one of the oldest European periodicals (since 1919), which is still being in print. From the 12th edition full conference papers have been published on the International Journal of Applied Electromagnetics and Mechanics-IJAEM, (IOS Press, Amsterdam, the Netherlands).

== International Steering Committee ==
- Carlo Ragusa (chair), Italy
- Johannes Sievert (past chair), Germany
- Phil Anderson, United Kingdom
- arlo Appino, Italy
- Luc Dupré, Belgium
- Masato Enokizono, Japan
- Fausto Fiorillo, Italy
- Nicolas Galopin, France
- Jeremy Hall, United Kingdom
- Yongjian Li, China
- Anthony John Moses, United Kingdom
- Helmut Pfützner, Austria
- Stefan Siebert, Germany
- Marian Soiński, Poland
- Derac Son, South Korea
- Kiyoshi Wajima, Japan
- Xing Zhou, China
- Jian Guo Zhu, Australia

== 1&2DM Workshops ==
1&2DM is usually held in September. The years are chosen as to alternate with the Soft Magnetic Materials Conference:

- 1st – Braunschweig, Germany – 1991
- 2nd – Ōita, Japan – 1992
- 3rd – Turin, Italy – 1993
- 4th – Cardiff, United Kingdom – 1995
- 5th – Grenoble, France – 1997
- 6th – Badgastein, Austria – 2000
- 7th – Lüdenscheid, Germany – 2002
- 8th – Ghent, Belgium – 2004
- 9th – Częstochowa, Poland – 2006
- 10th – Cardiff, United Kingdom – 2008 (Note: organised by Wolfson Centre for Magnetics)
- 11th – Ōita, Japan – 2010
- 12th – Vienna, Austria – 2012
- 13th – Turin, Italy – 2014
- 14th – Tianjin, China – 2016
- 15th – Grenoble, France – 2018
- 16th – Cardiff, United Kingdom – 2020 (Note: The 16th Workshop in 2020 was postponed due to the Coronavirus Pandemic of 2019–2021. Rather than wait four years between workshops, the Cardiff University MAGMA Centre organised a combination of a virtual workshop on 29–30 September 2021 and an in person workshop in Cardiff on 20–22 September 2022)
- 17th – Lüdenscheid, Germany – 2024
