= Pocono Conference =

Major meeting of American physicists led by Robert Oppenheimer in 1948

The Pocono Conference of 30 March to 2 April 1948 was the second of three postwar conferences held to discuss quantum physics; arranged by Robert Oppenheimer for the National Academy of Sciences. It followed the Shelter Island Conference of 1947 and preceded the Oldstone Conference of 1949.

Held at the Pocono Manor Inn in the Pocono Mountains of Pennsylvania, midway between Scranton, Pennsylvania and the Delaware Water Gap, 28 physicists attended. New participants were Niels Bohr, Aage Bohr, Paul Dirac, Walter Heitler, Eugene Wigner and Gregor Wentzel; while Hans Kramers, Duncan A. MacInnes, Arnold Nordsieck, Linus Pauling and who were at the Shelter Island Conference were absent.

Julian Schwinger gave a day-long presentation of his developments in quantum electrodynamics (QED), the last great fling of the old way of doing quantum mechanics. Richard Feynman offered his version of quantum electrodynamics, introducing Feynman diagrams for the first time; it was unfamiliar and no-one followed it, so Feynman was motivated to go back to Cornell University and write his work up for publication so others could see it in cold print. Schwinger and Feynman compared notes; and although neither could really understand the other’s approach, their arrival at the same answer helped to confirm the theory. And on his return to Princeton University, Oppenheimer received a third version by Sin-Itiro Tomonaga; his version of QED was somewhat simpler than Schwinger's.

Schwinger, Feynman and Tomonaga would receive the 1965 Nobel Prize in Physics for their development of QED.

== See also ==
- List of physics conferences
