= Duncan A. MacInnes =

American chemist

Duncan Arthur MacInnes
- Born: March 31, 1885; Salt Lake City, Utah, United States
- Died: September 23, 1965 (aged 80); Hanover, New Hampshire, United States
- Known for: Principles of Electrochemistry; Experimental verification of Debye–Hückel theory MacInness glass
- Awards: Nichols Medal (1942); Edward Goodrich Acheson Award (1948)
- Scientific career
- Fields: electrochemistry
- Workplaces: Rockefeller Institute for Medical Research; Massachusetts Institute of Technology
- Doctoral advisor: Edward Wight Washburn
- Doctoral students: Margaret Oakley Dayhoff

Duncan Arthur MacInnes (March 31, 1885 – September 23, 1965) was an American chemist known for his work in electrochemistry and pH detection. He also carried out experimental work to verify Debye–Hückel theory of electrolysis.

As a member of the Rockefeller Institute for Medical Research, he was the organizer the 1947 Shelter Island Conference where the experimental validation of quantum electrodynamics was first presented.

== Life ==
Duncan Arthur MacInnes was born in 1885 in Salt Lake City, Utah. At the age of thirteen he had streetcar accident, where he lost two fingers and injured his leg.

In 1907, MacIness got his Bachelor of Science in chemical engineering from University of Utah and Master of Science from the University of Illinois in 1909.

MacIness obtained his PhD on the topic of ion hydration of aqueous salt solutions, from the University of Illinois in 1911 under the direction of Edward Wight Washburn.

He continued teaching at Illinois until he left to do postdoctoral research in Massachusetts Institute of Technology (MIT) in 1917, where he became associate professor in 1921.

Botanist Winthrop John Van Leuven Osterhout persuaded MacInnes to come to the Rockefeller Institute for Medical Research in New York City as an associate member in 1926. He became a member in 1940, and became an emeritus member in 1950.

During World War II, MacInnes worked on chemical warfare as director of a research group at the Rockefeller Institute. He also worked with the Office of Scientific Research and Development in a study directed toward isolation of uranium-235.

After the war, he and Karl K. Darrow organized a series of conferences focused specifically on quantum electrodynamics (QED) bringing top priority physicists of the time. These conferences including the 1947 Shelter Island Conference chaired by J. Robert Oppenheimer, where the first results on Lamb–Retherford experiment on vacuum polarization were presented.

== Research ==
MacInnes specialized in electrochemistry.

His work on electrometric titrations led to the development of a small electrode responsive to pH. Working with Malcolm Dole, he developed a low-resistance glass for glass electrodes sensitive to pH, the so-called MacInnes-type glass or 015 pH corning glass.

Between 1921 and 1927 he carried important experiments to verify Debye–Hückel theory of electrolysis.

Other works included improving the moving boundary method to determine ion transport number, studies on the dependence of the acidity constants of organic acids on their constitution, and studies on liquid junction potentials.

== Textbook ==
The work of MacInnes and his associates at Rockefeller Institute led to his reference book Principles of Electrochemistry published in 1939.

== Awards and honors ==
MacInnes was elected fellow to the National Academy of Sciences and the American Philosophical Society. He was president of the Electrochemical Society between 1936 and 1937.

MacInnes received many honors including

- the William H. Nichols Medal in 1942 of the American Chemical Society;
- the 1948 President's Certificate of Merit, for his work during the World War II;
- the Edward Goodrich Acheson Award of the Electrochemical Society in 1948.
