= Anthony John Moses =

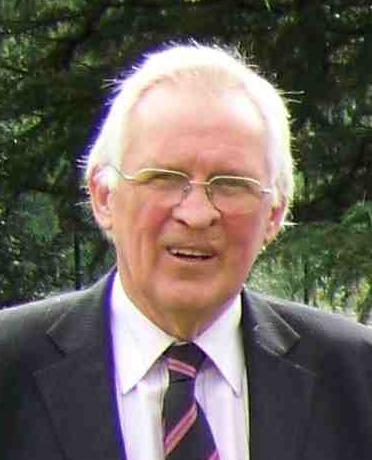
Professor Anthony John Moses

Anthony John Moses (born 12 October 1942, in Newport) is a Welsh scientist, researcher and professor, former director of Wolfson Centre for Magnetics.

== Education ==
Moses completed his BEngTech with first class honours in 1961. After gaining a first class honours degree in Electrical Engineering at University of Wales, Institute of Science and Technology (UWIST) in 1966, he worked as a design engineer at GKN Birwelco Limited.

He returned to the university and carried out a PhD studies at UWIST, where he graduated in 1970.

== Further career ==
After gaining the PhD degree, he started to work for Wolfson Centre for the Technology of Soft Magnetic Materials, at the time directed by Prof. Jack. E. Thompson. At the Wolfson Centre Moses proceeded as a research fellow, lecturer, senior lecturer, reader and finally a professor. He was awarded Doctor of Science by the University of Wales in 1990.

== As director of the Wolfson Centre ==
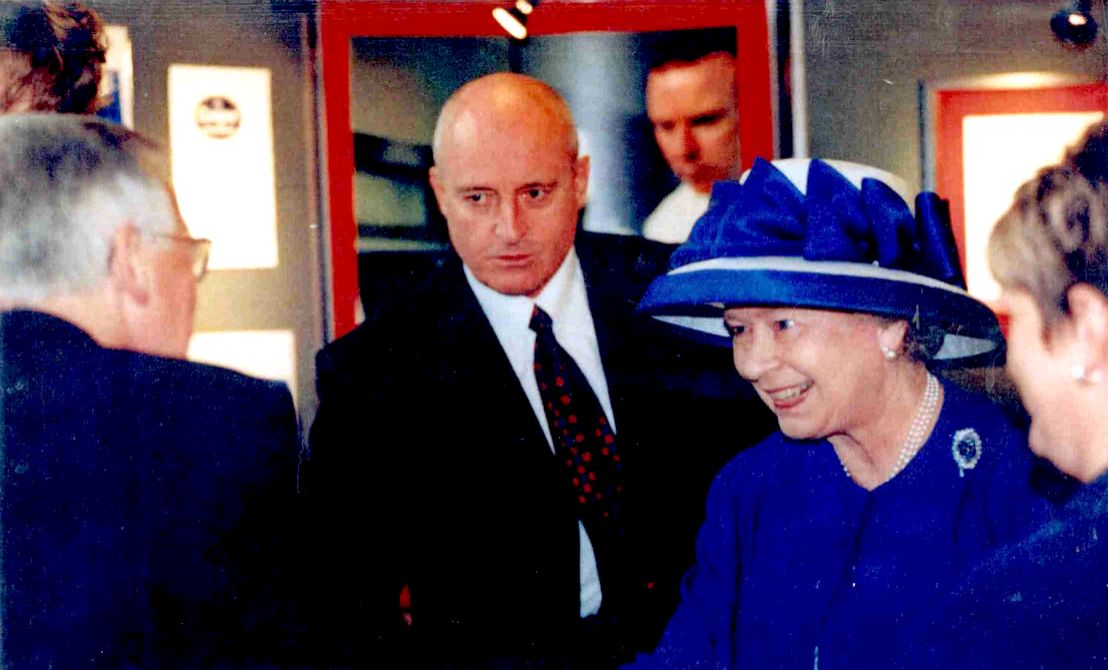
Anthony J. Moses during the visit of Queen Elizabeth II at Cardiff University

In the same year Prof. Thompson retired and Prof. Moses became the new director of the Wolfson Centre. In 2001 the Wolfson Centre was awarded the status of the European Centre of Excellence.

During his directorship the Wolfson Centre carried out experimental and educational activity in the field of soft magnetic materials, in particular the measurement of magnetic properties, modelling of the phenomena and processes occurring in magnetic materials applied in electrical machines.

He participated in realization of government and industrial research contracts. In the last 10 years of his directorship he supervised contracts valued at over 5 million pounds. Within the period 1998–2000 he was the chairman of steering committee of Materials Forum in Wales, member of several scientific societies (e.g. IEE and IEEE), member of Steering Group and Editorial Boards of several scientific conferences (e.g. Soft Magnetic Materials Conference and International Workshop on 1 & 2 Dimensional Magnetic Measurement and Testing). His teaching experience comprises the coordination of two Tempus Projects. He also directed teaching schemes of postgraduate studies and PhD studies in electrical engineering and magnetic materials technology at Cardiff University, supervised over 50 PhD students and of 60 higher degree projects, organised short courses and open days at the Wolfson Centre.

Moses published over 500 research papers in professional international journals on magnetics technology. He presented numerous invited papers and lectures at conferences in the UK and many countries worldwide, including: USA, Japan, Korea, China, France, Spain, Italy, Greece, Germany, Russia, Poland, Sweden, Slovakia, Czech Republic and Hungary.

In 2000 Moses was introduced to Queen Elizabeth II, who visited Cardiff University.

== Main scientific achievements ==
- Research and interpretation of the influence of insulation coatings of electrical steels and mechanical stress on the properties of magnetic cores, reducing power losses and improved magnetic properties.
- Modelling of magnetisation processes of soft magnetic materials.
- Development of magneto-optical methods of domain observations in real-time and research on the dynamics of magnetisation processes of soft magnetic materials.
- Development of research on the phenomena occurring in amorphous magneto-elastic materials and their application in sensors.
- Research on the influence of higher harmonics of distorted magnetic flux on power losses.
- Development and description of the occurrence of rotational losses in magnetic cores.
- Development of method of reducing power losses and time-consuming design of magnetic cores by their splitting into parallel magnetic circuits.
- Development of method of thermo-magnetic treatment of transformer cores.
- Lead author of textbook entitled Electrical Steels", published by the IET, London, in 2019.

== Co-operation with Poland ==
Under Moses directorship the Wolfson Centre co-operated closely with the Faculty of Electrical Engineering of Lublin University of Technology, Poland in 1980s and 1990s. The partnership resulted in numerous scientific papers, staff mobility and student exchange programmes. Several other international partners were participating, including South Bank University, London and Physikalisch-Technische Bundesanstalt, Braunschweig. All this contributed to obtaining the status of the European Centre of Excellence for the Application of Superconducting and Plasma Technologies in Power Engineering (ASPPECT) based at the Institute of Electrical Engineering and Electrotechnologies of Lublin University of Technology.

Wolfson Centre also collaborated with other Polish universities including: Częstochowa University of Technology and Wrocław University of Technology.

== Doctor Honoris Causa ==
In 2003 Lublin University of Technology celebrated its 50th anniversary. Using the occasion the Senate of the university approved the opinion elaborated by Prof. Bolesław Mazurek on the scientific, educational and organisational output of Prof. Moses and promoted the title of Doctor Honoris Causa of Lublin University of Technology to Prof. Anthony John Moses on 14 May 2003, after the Senate resolution No 40/3/2002-2005.

== Present times ==
Since his retirement in 2012, Professor Moses has been an Emeritus Professor in Electrical Engineering at Cardiff University, UK, where he keeps an active interest in the properties, characterisation and applications of soft magnetic materials

== Awards and achievements ==
- 1986 – Fellow of IEE
- 1987 – Member of IEEE
- 1991 – IEE Maxwell Premium
- 1992–2005 – Director of the Wolfson Centre for Magnetics, Cardiff University, UK
- 1994 – Fellow of Institute of Materials
- 1999–2001 – Chairman of UK Magnetics Society
- 2003 – Doctor Honoris Causa of Lublin University of Technology, Poland
- 2009 – AEM Award of the Japanese Society of Applied Electromagnetics and Mechanics
- 2012 – Emeritus Professor of Electrical Engineering, Cardiff University
- 2014–2019 – Co-Chair of Workshop on Magnetism and Metallurgy conference series
- 2016 – Presented with Lifetime Contribution Award to Magnetics by the UK Magnetics Society
- 2018 – Life Member of IEEE

== Sources ==
- Some information based on: Renata Gałat (skład), Anna Machulska-Bartoszek (tłumaczenie), Professor Anthony John Moses, Doktor Honoris Causa Politechniki Lubelskiej, Opracowanie Instytutu Podstaw Elektrotechniki i Elektrotechnologii, Lublin 2003, Poland
