= Wolfson Centre for Magnetics =

Cardiff University, UK research centre

Coordinates: 51.484°N 3.169°W

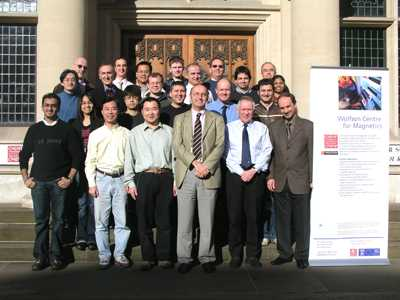
Members of Wolfson Centre for Magnetics in front of School of Engineering (Cardiff University)

Wolfson Centre for Magnetics (WCM) is a research and knowledge centre operating within School of Engineering at Cardiff University.

== Research ==
WCM is a centre for research, teaching and technology transfer over a wide spectrum of magnetics, including magnetic engineering, magnetic materials, magnetic devices, and the physics of magnetism.

Research within WCM focuses on several areas related to production, characterisation and applications of magnetic materials. The scope of the centre's research activities has recently been broadened by the addition of several new academic staff, allowing the Wolfson Centre for Magnetics to capitalise on the anticipated growth of research opportunities in collaborative, interdisciplinary projects in magnetism and magnetic materials. Computer aided design in magnetics, electromagnetic machines, magnetic imaging, high permeability materials, magnetostriction, magnetic sensors and actuators, nanomagnetic materials, magnetic thin films and multilayers, magnetic material for data storage, theory and modelling of magnetic materials are all areas of research currently under investigation in the centre.

Postgraduate research and industrial contract projects are carried out with the support of equipment and research facilities recently upgraded through major infrastructure investments.

WCM has collaborative links with leading research groups in magnetics throughout Europe, Asia, North and South America, Japan, China, India and Korea. Its members participate regularly in conferences, networking and collaborative research projects both nationally and internationally.

== Facilities ==
The Wolfson Centre for Magnetics has a wide range of state of the facilities within its laboratories, which support the research and industrial consultancy activities. Ongoing investment, including an award from the EPSRC/EST Joint Infrastracture Fund (JIF) in 2003 helped in continuous improvement of existing infrastructure and a Strategic Research Investment Fund (SRIF) awarded in 2005–2006.

The existing facilities include:

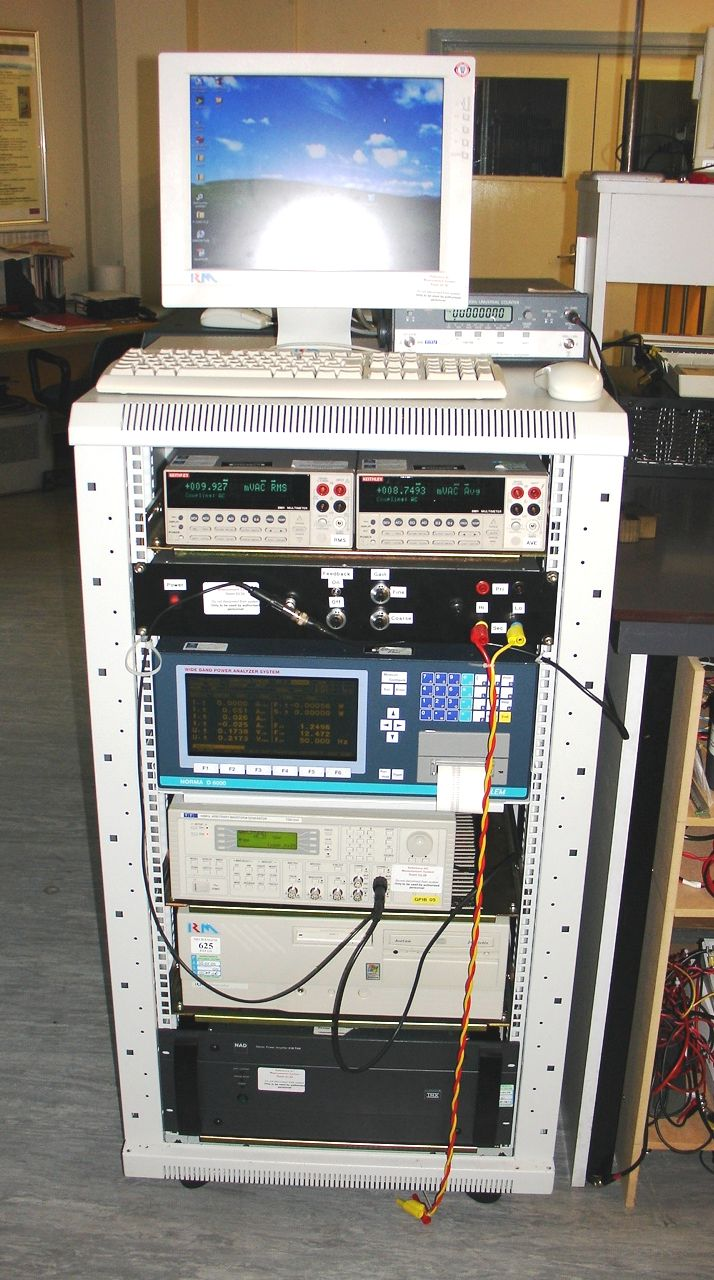
An example of a measuring system

=== AC and DC properties ===
The power loss, permeability, apparent power, flux density, magnetic field, Barkhausen noise, magnetostriction characteristics of soft magnetic materials and hard magnetic materials can be measured with a range of test systems under DC, AC and rotational magnetising conditions. These systems enable material in a wide range of geometries to be tested from 0.001 Hz up to 200 kHz with controlled arbitrary waveforms.

=== Stress and temperature annealing ===
Several of the AC and DC characterisation systems can be used with the sample under stress (±50 kN) or at a pre-defined temperature (varied from −150 °C to +600 °C using an environmental chamber, laboratory oven or oil bath).

=== Micro/nano scale characterisation ===
High magnification domain observation system uses the longitudinal and polar Kerr effect for dynamic observation of surface domain structures at a maximum rate of 1825 frames per second and maximum magnification of 500 times.

Vibrating Sample Magnetometer is used for the DC characterisation of magnetic films, tapes and powders at magnetic fields up to 3 T in the temperature range from 8 K to 1270 K.

Magnetic Property Measurement System (MPMS) performs DC characterisation utilising a reciprocating sample and SQUID (superconducting quantum interference device) detection for ultimate resolution at magnetic fields up to 5 T.

Physical Property Measurement System (PPMS) enables the measurement of phenomena such as the magnetocaloric effect, magnetostriction and magnetoresistance over a wide range of temperatures at magnetic fields of up to 7 T.

Magnetic properties close to the surface of soft magnetic materials can be analysed using the Magneto-Optic Kerr Effect Potter (MOKE) which utilises the transverse Kerr effect to measure magnetisation loops in samples such as ferromagnetic films.

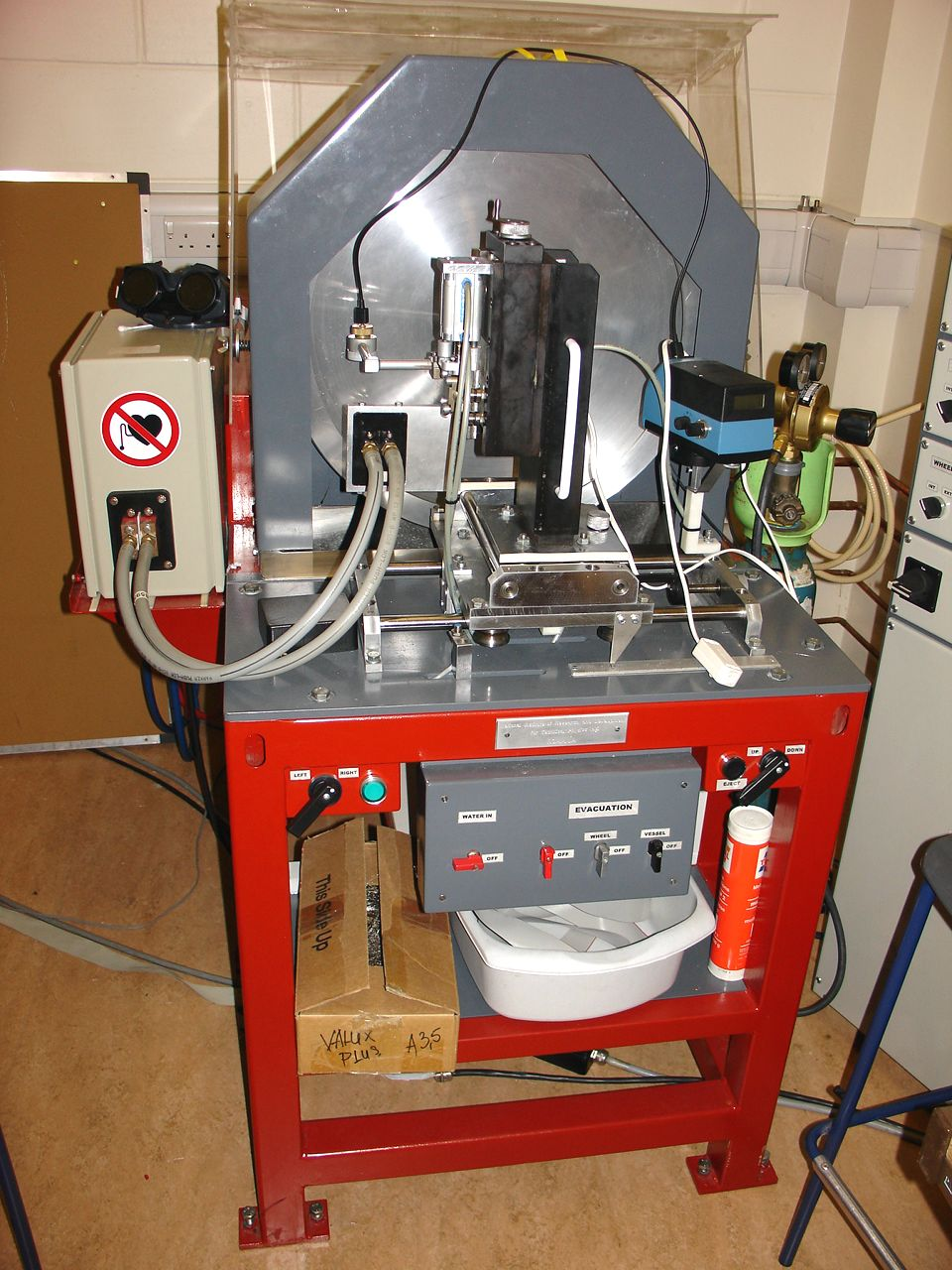
A system for production of amorphous microwires

=== Fabrication of materials ===
There is a magnetic microwire-making room, which is equipped with all units necessary for the production of uncoated and glass-coated amorphous and nanocrystalline wires using rapid quenching from the melt techniques. The room contains:

- Pre-alloy preparation unit - capacity 20-200 g, provides 10^{−6} atm vacuum or inert gas atmosphere. It consist of a quartz chamber and an Edwards Diffstak combined vacuum system. Can be used to prepare metallic pre-alloys containing metals (Fe, Co, Ni), metalloids (P, B, C) and rare earth elements.
- In rotating-water quenched wires preparation unit - used for the preparation of metallic amorphous and nanocrystalline wires with cross section diameter around 125 μm and length up to 100 m.
- Glass-coated wires preparation unit - used for the preparation of glass-coated wires (amorphous and nanocrystalline), with diameter 1-50 μm of metallic part and 3-15 μm thickness of the glass coating.

An induction heater providing an output power of 5 kW at an operating frequency of up to 400 kHz, which operates with multiple workheads and with induction coils of various geometry is used to supply the power for all the above-mentioned units.

=== Modelling and simulation ===
The Centre employs electromagnetic design and analysis software. These are used in the simulation of 2D and 3D electromagnetic applications, such as the design and optimization of electrical machines, non-destructive evaluation, sensors and actuators, permanent magnet devices and high frequency applications.

=== Performance of electromagnetic devices ===
A 3 phase transformer tester is available for the characterisation of production transformers or simulated cores with a rating up to 15 kVA driven by either a constant voltage transformer or selected inverter drives through computer controlled variacs.

A range of dynamometers are used for the assessment of the performance of rotating machines up to a maximum speed of 24,000 rpm and maximum rating of 24 kW. Variable loads may be applied using eddy current brakes or DC generators.

A wide range of electromagnetic emissions and immunity testing (including conducted, radiated, ESD, surges, interrupts, harmonics and flicker) can be performed with the EMC test suite, which is housed within custom built electromagnetically shielded enclosures. Shielding efficiency of sheet materials under DC and low frequency magnetic fields can also be assessed.

Low levels of ambient magnetic field are attained using a 5 layer Mumetal enclosure. Various coil systems and highly sensitive field sensors may be used for the calibration of novel magnetic sensors.

Acoustic noise emanating from devices such as transformers, motors and actuators can be measured in the hemi-anechoic acoustic chamber using calibrated microphones.

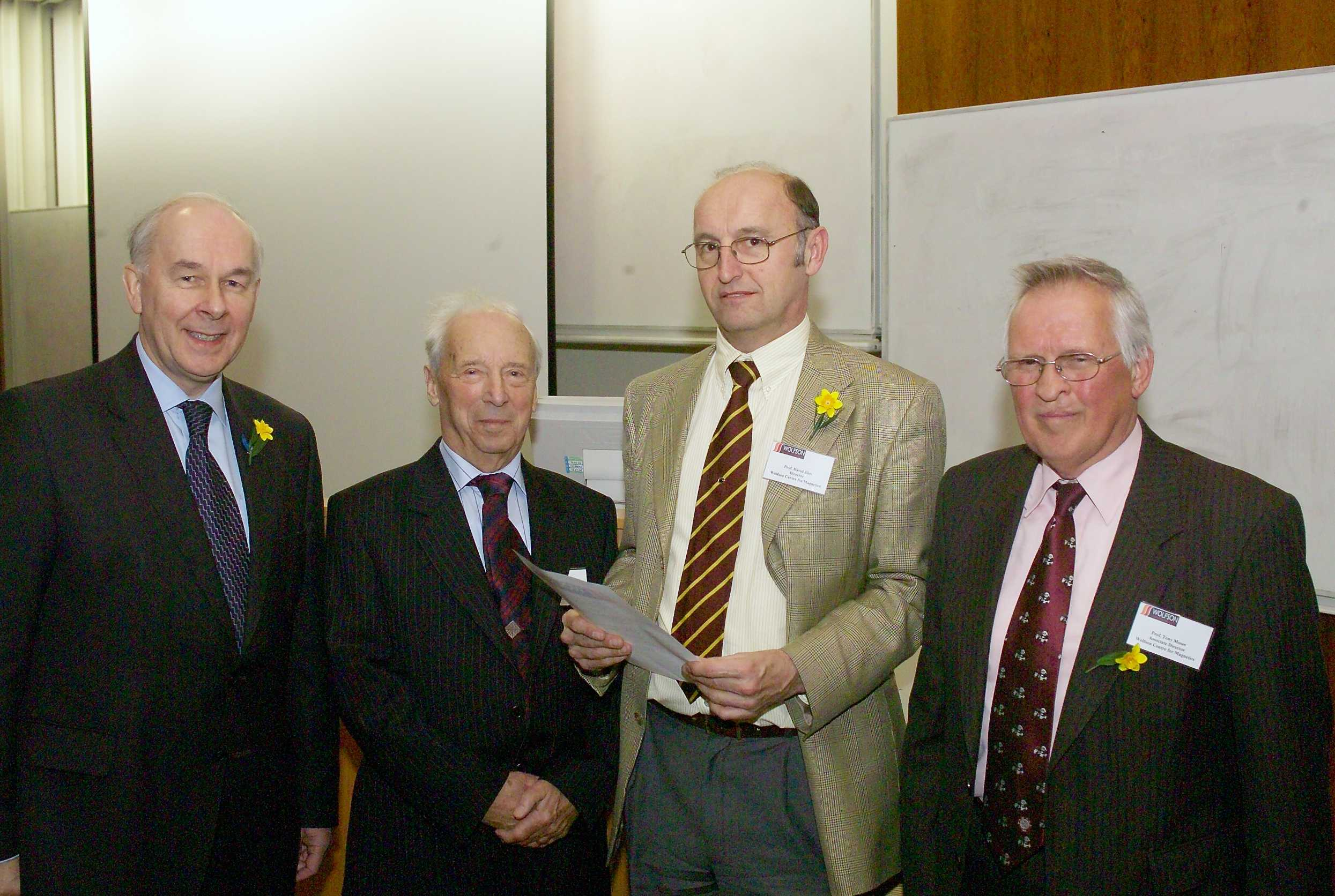
Left to right: Dr David Grant (Vice-Chancellor of Cardiff University), Prof. Jack E. Thompson (first director of WCM from 1969 to 1990), Prof. David Jiles (director of WCM, from 2005 until present) and Prof. Anthony J. Moses (director of WCM from 1990 to 2005)

== History ==
In 1969 a grant from the Wolfson Foundation of £132,000 was awarded to the University of Wales Institute of Science and Technology (UWIST) to establish a research centre to carry out basic and applied studies on magnetic materials and their industrial applications. Professor Jack E. Thompson was appointed the director of the Wolfson Centre for the Technology of Soft Magnetic Materials. The original objective was to create a unique UK Centre capable of competing at the international level. This objective remains broadly the same today. A property was purchased in 30 The Parade - a street near the university's buildings.

In the 1970s the WCM was awarded the multidisciplinary Centre of Excellence recognition by the Science Research Council, the forerunner of today's EPSRC. Professor Thompson was appointed Head of Department of Electrical and Electronic Engineering at University College Cardiff (UCC) and by mutual agreement WCM was transferred to UCC.

WCM hosted the Second Soft Magnetic Materials Conference (SMM2) in 1975 and the centre's name was changed to the Wolfson Centre for Magnetics Technology reflecting its broader range of expertise and activities. The Wolfson Centre hosted SMM5 in 1985 and research carried out at the Centre became commercialised with the establishment of one of the university's first spin out companies, MR Sensors Ltd., to manufacture thin film sensors in Cardiff.

When UWIST and UCC merged in 1988 the Wolfson Centre became part of the School of Electrical, Electronic and Systems Engineering, which later became the Cardiff School of Engineering. The Centre later moved to its present location in purpose built laboratories in the Queen's Buildings on Newport Road, which was part of a £30 million refurbishment of Engineering and Science buildings at Cardiff University.

Professor Thompson retired in 1990 and Professor Moses became the new director. In 1994 the WCM was designated a Centre of Expertise by the Welsh Development Agency. The Wolfson Centre hosted another major international conference, the International Symposium on Non-Linear Electromagnetics (ISEM) in 1995.

In 1999, major government funding of £1.3 million under the Joint Infrastructure Fund (JIF) was awarded to the Wolfson Centre to expand and improve facilities and enable the Wolfson Centre research staff to carry out cutting-edge magnetics research into the next decade.

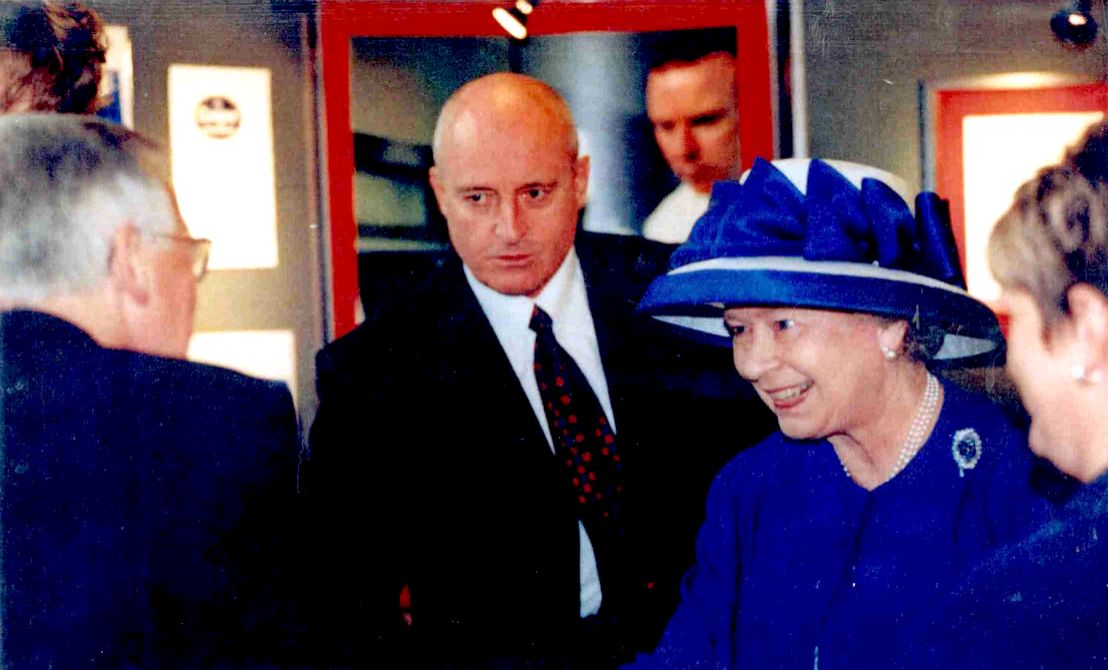
Prof. A.J. Moses (first from the left) and Queen Elizabeth II (second from the right)

In 2000 Queen Elizabeth II visited Cardiff University and also saw some activity of the WCM.

In 2001 the Wolfson Centre hosted the first UK Joint Magnetics Workshop (JMW) of the new millennium and was approved as one of 20 Centres of Excellence for Technology and Industrial Collaboration (CETIC) within Wales. The formal opening of new Wolfson Centre facilities established as a result of the £1.3 million investment awarded under the Joint Infrastructure Fund took place in January 2003.

In 1995, the WCM hosted the ISEM Conference on its first visit to Europe.

On 14 May 2003 Prof. A.J. Moses was awarded an honorary degree - Doctor Honoris Causa by the Lublin University of Technology (LUT), Poland. This was partially a part of recognition of the strong cooperation between LUT, other Polish Institutes and WCM, which started in 1985.

In June 2004 the Wolfson Centre was host to the Fifth European Magnetic Sensors and Actuators Conference (EMSA).

In August 2005 Professor David Jiles was appointed as the new director and the name of the centre was changed to its current form Wolfson Centre for Magnetics to better reflect the range of activities being undertaken within the centre, which includes not only magnetics technology but also basic scientific aspects of magnetics.

In 2005-2006 the WCM was awarded a Strategic Research Investment Fund (SRIF) (£1.5 million).

== Present and future ==
WCM is a multinational centre and its members come from various countries around the world: Bangladesh, Brazil, Burma, China, France, Germany, Ghana, Greece, India, Iraq, Japan, Lebanon, Poland, Romania, South Africa, Spain, Turkey, UK, Ukraine, Thailand and United States.

Cardiff University plans a further major expansion of the WCM to increase the number of faculty working in magnetics and to continue the improvement of the existing research facilities. The expansion will focus on aspects of magnetics related to energy, healthcare, nanoscale magnetics, sensors. These include: bulk hard magnetic materials, high frequency materials, low-dimensional materials (micro and nano), nanoscale magnetic structures, magnetic non-destructive evaluation methods, and biomedical applications of magnetics.

Upon completion, the Wolfson Centre for Magnetics is projected to become one of the largest and most comprehensively equipped magnetic research facilities in Europe.

In 2007, the WCM was the host for the Soft Magnetic Materials Conference (SMM18) and in 2008 will be for 1&2DM Workshop.

== People ==
During its existence over 150 higher degrees were awarded on basis of research carried out in WCM. Over the years many internationally known scientists were, and are working within the WCM:

- Prof. A. Basak
- Prof. P. Beckley
- Prof. D.C. Jiles
- Prof. A. J. Moses
- Prof. J. E. Thompson
