= European Conference on the Dynamics of Molecular Systems =

Scientific conference

MOLEC, the European Conference on the Dynamics of Molecular Systems, is a biannual scientific conference. It is held every two years usually late summer. The first conference was held in Trento, Italy in the year of 1976.

== Conference locations ==
The conference has been held in the following locations:

1. Trento (Italy), 1976, organized by Peter Toennies and Franco Gianturco
2. Brandbjerg Hojskole (Denmark), 1978
3. Oxford (UK), 1980
4. Nijmegen (The Netherlands), 1982
5. Jerusalem (Israel), 1984
6. Aussois (France), 1986
7. Assisi (Italy), 1988
8. Bernkastel-Kues (Germany), 1990
9. Prague (Czech Republic), 1992
10. Salamanca (Spain), 1994
11. Nyborg Strand (Denmark), 1996
12. Bristol (UK), 1998
13. Jerusalem (Israel), 2000
14. Istanbul (Turkey), 2002
15. Nunspeet (The Netherlands), 2004
16. Trento (Italy), 2006
17. St. Petersburg (Russia), 2008
18. Curia (Portugal), 2010
19. Oxford (UK), 2012
20. Gothenburg (Sweden), 2014
21. Toledo (Spain), 2016, chair Alberto Garcia Vela
22. Dinard (France), 2018
23. online workshop, 2020, organized by Hamburg
24. Hamburg (Germany), 2022, chairs Francesca Calegari & Jochen Küpper

== MOLEC Prizes ==
MOLEC Senior Prize

- 1996: Prof Jan Peter Toennies
- 1998: Prof. Franco Gianturco
- 2004: Prof Raphael Levine
- 2006: Prof. Zdenek Herman
- 2008: Prof. Gabriel Balint-Jurti
- 2016: Prof. Dieter Gerlich
- 2018: Prof David Parker

Zdenek Herman MOLEC Young Scientist Prize

- 2016: Prof. Sebastiaan Y. T. van de Meerakker
- 2018: Prof Francesca Calegari
