= Oldstone Conference =

Physics conference in United States (1949)

The Oldstone Conference of 11 to 14 April 1949 was the third of three postwar conferences held to discuss quantum physics; arranged for the National Academy of Sciences by J. Robert Oppenheimer, who was again chairman. It followed the Shelter Island Conference of 1947 and the Pocono Conference of 1948. There were 24 participants; new participants were Robert F. Christy, Freeman Dyson, George Placzek, and Hideki Yukawa.

Held at Oldstone-on-the-Hudson in Peekskill, New York, the main talking-point was Richard Feynman’s approach to quantum electrodynamics (QED); Feynman was now (at 30) the leading physicist of his generation.

Dyson presented the equivalence between the approaches of Julian Schwinger, Feynman and Yukawa.

Conference notes were taken by John Archibald Wheeler and Arthur Wightman.

== See also ==
- List of physics conferences

== Bibliography ==
- Gribbin, John & Mary (1997). Richard Feynman: A Life in Science. England: Viking Press. p. 118. ISBN 0-670-87245-8.
- Metra, Jagdish (1994). The Beat of a Different Drum: The life and science of Richard Feynman. Oxford, England: Clarendon Press. pp. 278–279. ISBN 0-19-853948-7.
