= Workshop on Geometric Methods in Physics =

Mathematics conference

- Status: Active
- Genre: Mathematics conference
- Frequency: Annual
- Location: Białowieża or Białystok
- Country: Poland
- Years active: 1982–present
- Inaugurated: 1982; 44 years ago
- Founder: Anatol Odzijewicz
- Most recent: 29 June – 4 July 2026
- Next event: 5 July – 10 July 2027
- Major events: Active
- Organiser: University of Białystok
- Website: wgmp.uwb.edu.pl

The Workshop on Geometric Methods in Physics (WGMP) is a conference on mathematical physics focusing on geometric methods in physics. It is organized each year since 1982 either in the village of Białowieża, Poland or in Białystok.

WGMP is organized by the Chair of Mathematical Physics of Faculty of Mathematics, University of Białystok. Its founder and main organizer was Anatol Odzijewicz. Since the year 2022 the chairman of the Organizing Committee is Alina Dobrogowska.

Home venue of WGMP is in the heart of the Białowieża National Park. A number of social events, including campfire, an excursion to the Białowieża forest and a banquet, are usually organized during the week. Recently, conferences also take place in Białystok, in the campus of the University.

== Notable participants ==
In the past, Workshops were attended by scientists including: Roy Glauber, Francesco Calogero, Ludvig Faddeev, Martin Kruskal, es:Bogdan Mielnik, Emma Previato, Stanisław Lech Woronowicz, Vladimir E. Zakharov, Dmitry Anosov, de:Gérard Emch, George Mackey, fr:Moshé Flato, Daniel Sternheimer, Tudor Ratiu, Simon Gindikin, Boris Fedosov, pl:Iwo Białynicki-Birula, Jędrzej Śniatycki, Askolʹd Perelomov, Alexander Belavin, Yvette Kosmann-Schwarzbach, pl:Krzysztof Maurin, Mikhail Shubin, Kirill Mackenzie.

== Special sessions ==
Many times special sessions were scheduled within the programme of the Workshop. In the year 2016 there was a session "Integrability and Geometry" financed by National Science Foundation. In the year 2017 there was a session dedicated to the memory and scientific achievements of S. Twareque Ali, long time participant and co-organizer of the Workshop. In the year 2018 there was a session dedicated to scientific achievements of prof. Daniel Sternheimer on the occasion of his 80th birthday. In the previous years, there were sessions dedicated to other prominent mathematicians and physicists such as S.L. Woronowicz, G. Emch, B. Mielnik, F. Berezin.

== School on Geometry and Physics ==
Since 2012 the Workshop is accompanied by a School on Geometry and Physics, which is targeted at young researchers and graduate students. During the School several courses by leading experts in mathematical physics take place.

== Proceedings ==
Starting at 1992, after the Workshop a volume of proceedings is published. In the recent years it was published in the series Trends in Mathematics by Birkhäuser. In 2005 a commemorative tome Twenty Years of Bialowieza: A Mathematical Anthology. Aspects of Differential Geometric Methods in Physics was published by World Scientific.

== Wigner Medal ==
The Wigner Medal was an award designed "to recognize outstanding contributions to the understanding of physics through Group Theory". It was administered by The Group Theory and Fundamental Physics Foundation, a publicly supported organization. Until 2020 the medal was awarded during the International Colloquium on Group Theoretical Methods in Physics. In order to continue the tradition of the Wigner Medal the Foundation and the Organizing Committee of WGMP decided in 2023 to cooperate in awarding the Medal. In 2024 the Department of Physics of the Texas A&M University and the Hagler Institute for Advanced Study joined the cooperation which consists of jointly appointing the Selection Committee of the Wigner Medal and organizing the Wigner Medal presentation ceremony alternatively at the WGMP and at the Texas A&M University.

Since 2020 the following Medals were awarded:

- 2020: Yvette Kosmann-Schwarzbach
- 2022: Iwo Białynicki-Birula, Daniel Greenberger
- 2024: Stanisław Woronowicz
- 2026: Yakir Aharonov, Michael Berry
