= International Conference on Surface Plasmon Photonics =

Biennial physics conference

The International Conference on Surface Plasmon Photonics (SPP) is a biennial conference series in the field of plasmonics, including electron-plasmon interactions; energy harvesting; graphene, mid-IR, and THz plasmonics; near-field instrumentation; novel plasmonic materials; particle manipulations; plasmonic, metasurface, and metamaterial devices; sensors and transducers for biomedical applications; ultrafast and nonlinear phenomena; and quantum plasmonics.

== Special issues ==
Several scientific journals have published special issues reporting results from recent SPP conferences:

- SPP6: Park, Namkyoo; de Abajo, Javier Garcia; Bouhelier, Alexandre; Berini, Pierre (2013-11-04). "Focus issue on surface plasmon photonics introduction" (PDF). Optics Express. 21 (22): 27286–27290. Bibcode:2013OExpr..2127286B. doi:10.1364/OE.21.027286. PMID 24216952.
- SPP7: Levy, Uriel; Berini, Pierre; Maier, Stefan A.; Mortensen, N. Asger (2015-12-14). "Focus Issue on surface plasmon photonics introduction". Optics Express. 23 (25): 32075–32079. Bibcode:2015OExpr..2332075L. doi:10.1364/OE.23.032075. PMID 26698998.
- SPP8: Kawata, Yoshimasa; Sun, Greg; Tsai, Din Ping; Zayats, Anatoly (2018-07-18). "Special issue on recent developments and applications of plasmonics". ACS Photonics. 5 (7): 2538–2540. doi:10.1021/acsphotonics.8b00808.
- SPP9: Mortensen, N. Asger; Berini, Pierre; Levy, Uriel; Bozhevolnyi, Sergey I. (2020-02-04). "Proceedings of 9th International Conference on Surface Plasmon Photonics (SPP9)". Nanophotonics 9 (2): 245 (2020). doi:10.1515/nanoph-2019-0532
