= Charlotte Serber =

Manhattan Project member (1911–1967)

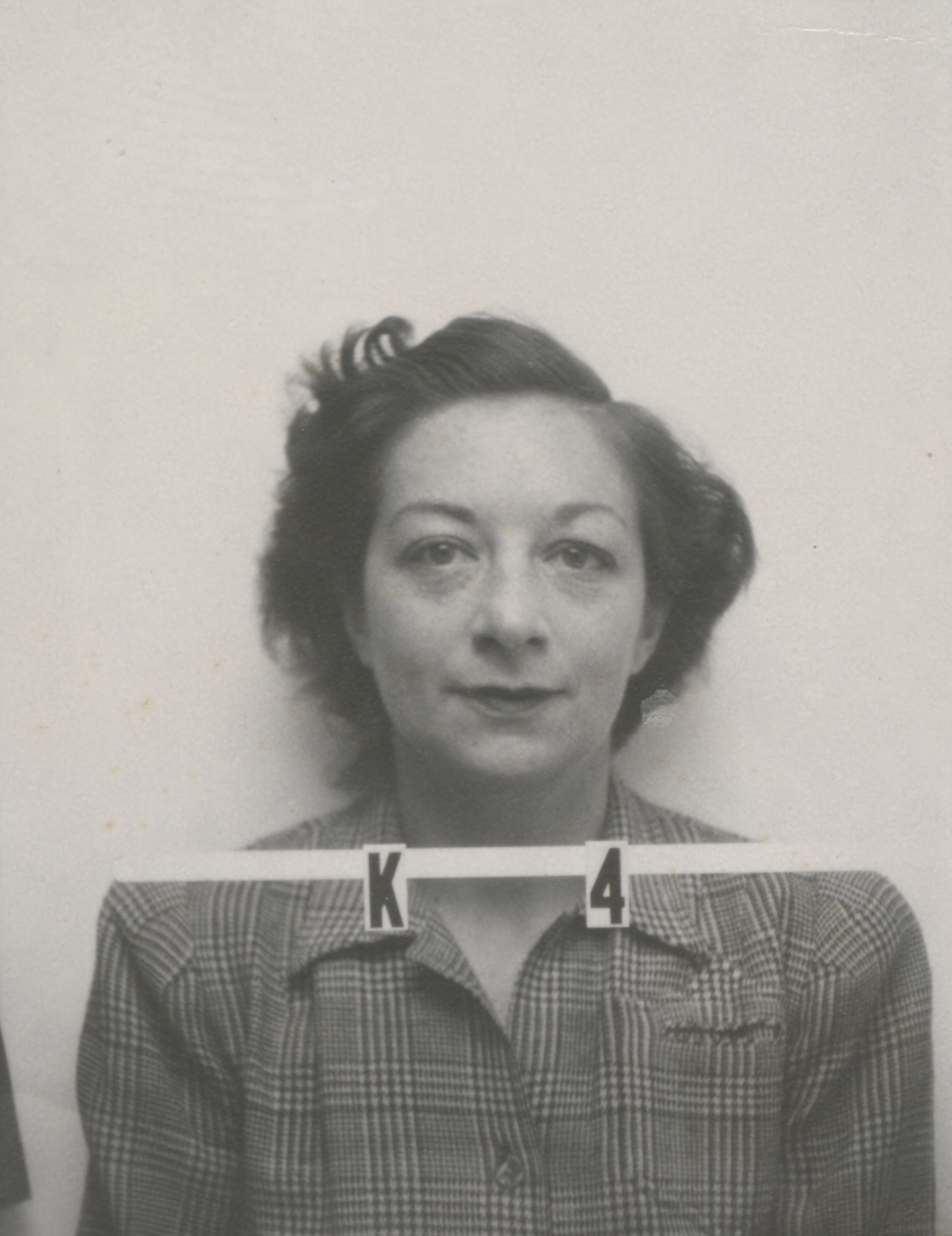
- Wartime Los Alamos identification badge, circa 1943
- Born: Charlotte Leof; July 26, 1911; Philadelphia, Pennsylvania, U.S.
- Died: May 22, 1967 (aged 55)
- Cause of death: Suicide
- Education: University of Pennsylvania (BA)
- Spouse: Robert Serber

Charlotte Serber (née Leof; July 26, 1911 – May 22, 1967) was an American journalist, statistician and librarian. She was the librarian of the Manhattan Project's Los Alamos Laboratory during World War II, and the laboratory's only female group leader. After the war she attempted to secure a position as a librarian at the Radiation Laboratory in Berkeley, but was rejected for lack of a security clearance; the likely reason was due to her political views. She later became a production assistant for the Broadway Theatre, and an interviewer for Louis Harris.

== Biography ==
Charlotte Leof was born in Philadelphia, Pennsylvania, on July 26, 1911, the youngest of three children of Morris V. Leof, a physician, and his wife Jennie née Chalfin. She had an older brother, the noted Pre-Columbian art collector and preeminent dentist Dr Milton Arnold Leof, and an older sister, Madeline Blitzstein (stepmother of the composer, lyricist, and librettist Marc Blitzstein). Her father was a member of the Socialist Party of America and was involved in left-wing activities. Visitors to their home included playwright Clifford Odets, journalist I. F. Stone, and physicist Wolfgang Pauli. She entered the University of Pennsylvania in 1929 and graduated in 1933. She married physicist Robert Serber soon after. Her father was the uncle of his stepmother, and they had known each other for many years.

Initially, they lived in Madison, Wisconsin, where Robert was a teaching assistant at the University of Wisconsin. They paid $25 per month for an apartment. From 1933 to 1935, Charlotte worked as a freelance journalist, writing articles for newspapers like the Boston Globe. Her work included an interview with the architect Frank Lloyd Wright. Robert was awarded a $1,200 postdoctoral fellowship by the National Research Council in 1934, and he decided to study it at Princeton University.

Robert and Charlotte Serber packed up and began the drive to Princeton, but en route they stopped at Ann Arbor, Michigan, to attend a summer school at the University of Michigan, where Robert met Robert Oppenheimer, and decided then and there that he would study at the University of California, Berkeley, instead. They lived in Berkeley, California, from 1934 to 1938. Charlotte Serber worked for the California State Relief Administration. They became close to Oppenheimer, spending the summers from 1935 to 1941 at his New Mexico ranch, Perro Caliente (Spanish for "hot dog").

In 1938, Robert accepted an assistant professorship at the University of Illinois at Urbana–Champaign. He was reluctant to do so, but was convinced by Isidor Isaac Rabi, who reminded him that there were few tenure-track academic positions for Jews. In Illinois, Charlotte initially went back to freelance journalism. From 1941 to 1942, she worked for the Office of Civilian Defense. She was politically active, serving as secretary of the Medical Aid Committee for Spain at Berkeley during the Spanish Civil War, and later of the Aid to Britain, Aid to China, and Aid to Russia Committees during World War II. She was also involved with the League of Women Voters. Although she had left-wing views, she was never a member of the Communist Party, unlike her brother and sister.

== Manhattan Project ==
In December 1941, Oppenheimer visited Urbana and asked Robert to join the Manhattan Project, the effort to develop an atomic bomb. Robert and Charlotte set out for Berkeley again in April 1942. They initially stayed in Oppenheimer's garage apartment. After taking a job in a shipyard, where she worked as a statistician, Charlotte Serber joined the Manhattan Project as a librarian at the Radiation Laboratory on January 11, 1943. On April 23, 1943, she officially transferred to Project Y. Serber was recruited as the project librarian despite having no formal training as such, because Oppenheimer wanted someone who would not be concerned about cutting corners. Arriving at Santa Fe, New Mexico, in March 1943, she spent her first couple of months working in the office of the Project Y director, Oppenheimer, as an assistant to Priscilla Greene, the executive secretary, because no books had yet arrived. She instituted the system of security passes, which were typewritten letters signed by Oppenheimer.

Serber became the only female group leader at the Los Alamos Laboratory. Lacking experience in cataloging books, she taught herself how to use the Dewey Decimal Classification system. The whole library had to be created from scratch. Some 1,200 books and the complete runs of 50 scientific journals were ordered to establish the library. Many of these were out of print, and were ordered through inter-library loan agreements through the University of California.

The library was divided into two parts: the main library and the technical report library. The former contained the books and journals. The first of the latter arrived by courier soon after the first books, in black suitcases carried by a courier, and were initially stored in a safe while a vault was being built. Some foreign journals came from the Office of Strategic Services Periodical Publications Program. Agents purchased journals in enemy, occupied and neutral countries, and these were copied and distributed. Enemy copyrights and patents were seized by the Office of Alien Property Custodian. One of the library's tasks was typing, copying and distributing these highly classified reports. The library staff grew to 12 people, mostly members of the Women's Army Corps and wives of scientists. Charlotte acknowledged that they might have looked unusual to outsiders:

A new arrival on the Hill was jostled out of his conventional idea of what a library staff looked like. Here, he was apt to find the librarian in blue jeans, one assistant in the best sweater girl tradition, another in strict WAAC uniform, and a third in the latest Lane Bryant number.

Serber was not permitted to view the Trinity Test, ostensibly because the test site had no facilities for women, but after the war, Oppenheimer acknowledged the importance of the job that she had done, writing to her on November 2, 1945:

No single hour of delay has been attributed by any man in the laboratory to a malfunctioning, either in the Library or in the classified files. To this must be added the fact of the surprising success in controlling and accounting for the mass of classified information, where a single serious slip might not only have caused us the profoundest embarrassment but might have jeopardized the successful completion of our job.

In 1946, Charlotte Serber and eight other women wrote accounts of their experiences at wartime Los Alamos. The manuscript was published in 1988 as Standing By and Making Do: Women of Wartime Los Alamos.

== Post war ==
Oppenheimer attempted to secure Robert a position at the University of California, but was blocked by the head of the Physics Department, Raymond T. Birge, who still felt that "one Jew in the department is enough." Instead, he was given a position with the Berkeley Radiation Laboratory, which had an independent status. However, he was given a professorial appointment in the department when Oppenheimer left for the Institute for Advanced Study. Charlotte Serber attempted to secure a position as a librarian at the Radiation Laboratory in 1946, but was rejected because she could not obtain a security clearance. The likely reason for her rejection was due to her political views.

Between 1946 and 1948, the FBI wiretapped her phone and opened her mail. In 1950, the University of California instituted a system of loyalty oaths in accordance with the Levering Act. Robert was willing to sign an oath, but became increasingly disturbed by the atmosphere in Berkeley, and in 1951 accepted an offer of a professorship at the Columbia University from Rabi. Serber became a production assistant for the Broadway Theatre. In 1965, she took a job with Louis Harris as an interviewer.

Serber suffered from depression after being diagnosed with Parkinson's disease, and took her own life with an overdose of sleeping pills on May 22, 1967. The Research Library at the Los Alamos National Laboratory remains as her legacy, and by 1999 it was one of the foremost scientific libraries in the United States.

== In popular culture ==
Serber was portrayed in the Oscar-winning film Oppenheimer (2023) by actress Jessica Erin Martin.

== Notes ==
- Bier, Lisa (December 1999). "Atomic Wives and the Secret Library at Los Alamos". American Libraries. 30 (11): 54–56. ISSN 0002-9769. JSTOR 25637414.
- Bird, Kai; Sherwin, Martin J. (2005). American Prometheus: The Triumph and Tragedy of J. Robert Oppenheimer. New York: Alfred A. Knopf. ISBN 0-375-41202-6. OCLC 56753298.
- Conant, Jennet (2005). 109 East Palace: Robert Oppenheimer and the Secret City of Los Alamos. New York: Simon & Schuster. ISBN 0-7432-5007-9. OCLC 57475908.
- Howes, Ruth H.; Herzenberg, Caroline L. (2003). Their Day in the Sun: Women of the Manhattan Project. Temple University Press. ISBN 978-1-59213-192-1. OCLC 51737839.
- Pais, Abraham (1999). "In Memoriam: Robert Serber 1909-1997". Physics in Perspective. 1 (1): 105–109. doi:10.1007/s000160050008. ISSN 1422-6944. S2CID 120238729.
- Serber, Charlotte (1988). "Labor Pains". In Wilson, Jane S.; Serber, Charlotte (eds.). Standing By and Making Do: Women of Wartime Los Alamos. Los Alamos, New Mexico: Los Alamos Historical Society. pp. 57–72. ISBN 0-941232-08-5. OCLC 611511093.
- Serber, Robert; Crease, Robert P. (1998). Peace & War: Reminiscences of a Life on the Frontiers of Science. New York: Columbia University Press. ISBN 978-0-231-10546-0. OCLC 1014748640.
- Smith, Alice Kimball; Weiner, Charles, eds. (1980). Robert Oppenheimer, Letters and Recollections. Cambridge: Harvard University Press. ISBN 0674776054. OCLC 5946652.
