= Middle European Cooperation in Statistical Physics =

The Middle European Cooperation in Statistical Physics (MECO) is an international conference on statistical physics which takes place every year in a different country of Europe. MECO evolved in the early 1970s with the aim of bridging the gap between the communities of scientists from the Eastern and Western parts of Europe, separated as they were by the Iron Curtain. Since then, MECO conferences have become the yearly nomadic reference meetings for the community of scientists who are active in the field of Statistical Physics in the broader sense, including modern interdisciplinary applications to biology, Finance, information theory, and quantum computation.

== History ==
The MECO conferences were deliberately created as an attempt to establish and maintain an exchange between scientists in the fields of statistical and condensed matter physics from Western and Eastern countries, overcoming the hurdles of the "Iron Curtain". In 1972, the Hungarian theorist Peter Szépfalusy started activities about organising a meeting of physicists from middle European countries, who worked in the area of critical phenomena. Another meeting took place in Budapest in the following year and the first MECO conference was organized 1974 in Vienna. Founding fathers of the conference included physicists, experimentalists as well as theorists, doing, especially, research on ferroelectricity, like Robert Blinc from Jugoslavia and K. Alex Müller from Switzerland.

In order to develop this concept in the mid-1970s and 1980's, the original intention was to have each year a conference, alternating on either side of the Iron Curtain. If it took place on the Eastern side, scientists from the communist countries could easier obtain permission to travel to the conference site. In addition, it was deemed essential to provide free (or very cheap) accommodation for participants and the low cost of attending MECO was also useful after the fall of the Iron Curtain, due to the resulting difficult economic situation in the Eastern part of Europe in the 1990s.

In this way, the organizers of the early MECO conferences succeeded, perhaps for the first time, to bring numerous scientists, despite the political difficulties, together and to create a lively atmosphere of fruitful scientific exchange. This has greatly helped to establish many collaborations which lasted up to the present time, when, partly thanks to the European Union, many more such collaborations have become possible. The ties created by MECO, however, still are useful to help scientific exchange, even though the scientific emphasis has changed from the traditional fields of statistical mechanics and solid-state physics to interdisciplinary themes of current interest as well.

In February 2022 the Ukrainian member of MECO was attacked by Russian military forces. Ukraine's President Zelenskyy, said a new Iron Curtain is coming. This situation disposed the MECO advisory board to the following Statement:

"The advisory board of MECO is shocked by the actions of the leadership of Russia against Ukraine – a MECO member. This act of violence goes against the values and aspirations of Europe’s scientists who, with the creation of MECO in 1974, sought to overcome the iron curtain that divided Eastern and Western countries.

The invasion of a free country is a brutal attack on the freedom of all nations, communities, and individuals. MECO’s aim is to enable scientific freedom for the academic community as an essential part of peaceful cooperation between countries. Academic freedom is only possible by respecting national freedom. The advisory board therefore calls on the academic community worldwide to maintain and support these values by condemning the actions of Russia’s leadership and calling for withdrawal of Russian forces from Ukraine with immediate effect."

== Past conferences ==
MECO usually gathers from 100 to 150 scientists almost every year. Below is the list of the past conference and their locations. Green color denotes the ones which took place on west side of Iron Curtain, red color – those on east. Such separation disappeared naturally after fall of USSR in 1991.

Year	Conference	Location	Country
1974	MECO	Vienna	(Austria)
1975	MECO 2	Regensburg	(West Germany)
1976	MECO 3	Bled	(Socialist Federal Republic of Yugoslavia)
1977	MECO 4	Unterägeri	(Switzerland)
1978	MECO 5	Boszkowo	(Poland)
1979	MECO 6	Trieste	(Italy)
1980	MECO 7	Budapest	(Hungary)
1981	MECO 8	Saarbrücken	(West Germany)
1982	MECO 9	Wien	(Austria)
1983	MECO 10	Bled	(Socialist Federal Republic of Yugoslavia)
1984	MECO 11	Gernrode	(East Germany)
1985	MECO 12	Aussois	(France)
1986	MECO 13	Liblice	(Czech Republic)
1987	MECO 14	Puidoux	(Switzerland)
1988	MECO 15	Karpacz	(Poland)
1989	MECO 16	Siena	(Italy)
1990	MECO 17	Balatonfüred	(Hungary)
1991	MECO 18	Duisburg	(Germany)
1994	MECO 19	Smolenice	(Slovakia)
1995	MECO 20	Wels	(Austria)
1996	MECO 21	Bled	(Slovenia)
1997	MECO 22	Szklarska Poręba	(Poland)
1998	MECO 23	Trieste	(Italy)
1999	MECO 24	Wittenberg	(Germany)
2000	MECO 25	Pont-a-Mousson	(France)
2001	MECO 26	Prague	(Czech Republic)
2002	MECO 27	Sopron	(Hungary)
2003	MECO 28	Saarbrücken	(Germany)
2004	MECO 29	Bratislava	(Slovakia)
2005	MECO 30	Cortona	(Italy)
2006	MECO 31	Primošten	(Croatia)
2007	MECO 32	Lądek-Zdrój	(Poland)
2008	MECO 33	Wels	(Austria)
2009	MECO 34	Leipzig	(Germany)
2010	MECO 35	Pont-a-Mousson	(France)
2011	MECO 36	Lviv	(Ukraine)
2012	MECO 37	Tatranské Matliare	(Slovakia)
2013	MECO 38	Trieste	(Italy)
2014	MECO 39	Coventry	(United Kingdom)
2015	MECO 40	Esztergom	(Hungary)
2016	MECO 41	Vienna	(Austria)
2017	MECO 42	Lyon	(France)
2018	MECO 43	Kraków	(Poland)
2019	MECO 44	Kloster Seeon	(Germany)
2020	MECO 45	Cluj	(Romania)
2021	MECO 46	Riga	(Latvia)
2022	MECO47	Erice	(Italy)
2023	MECO48	Stará Lesná	(Slovakia)
2024	MECO49	Kranjska Gora	(Slovenia)
2025	MECO50	Dubrovnik	(Croatia)
2026	MECO51	Pont-a-Mousson	(France)

== Future conferences ==
[MECO51] will take place in Pont-a-Mousson (France) on May 18–22, 2026.
