= Karl K. Darrow =

American physicist (1891–1982)

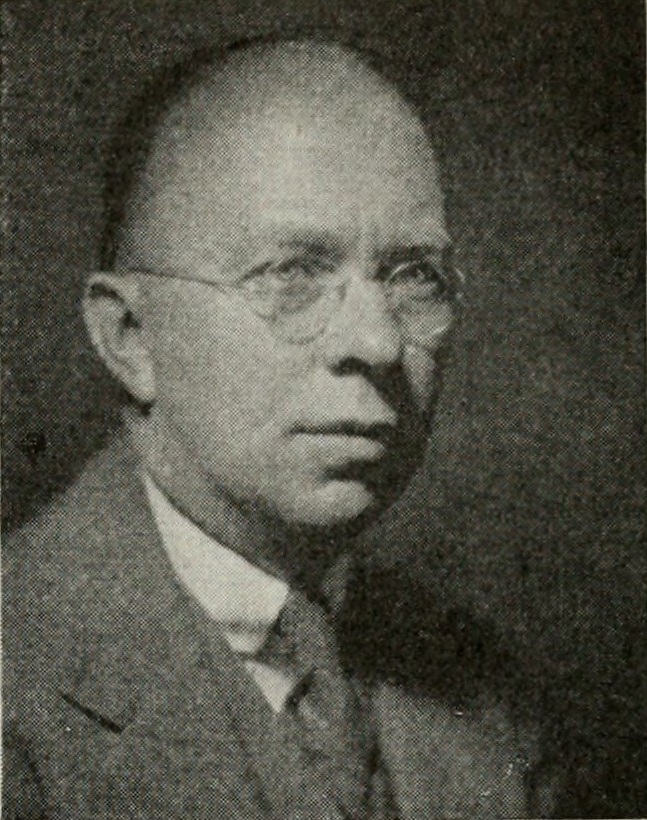
- Darrow in the Bell Telephone Magazine
- Born: November 26, 1891; Chicago, Illinois, United States
- Died: June 7, 1982 (aged 90); New York City, United States
- Education: University of Chicago
- Scientific career
- Fields: Physics
- Workplaces: Bell Labs
- Doctoral advisor: Robert A. Millikan

Karl Kelchner Darrow (November 26, 1891 – June 7, 1982) was an American physicist and secretary of the American Physical Society from 1941 to 1967.

== Biography ==
Darrow was born on November 26, 1891, in Chicago, Illinois. He received his PhD from the University of Chicago, in Chicago, IL, under Robert A. Millikan in 1917. Darrow spent his career at Western Electric beginning 1917, and later at Bell Laboratories from its founding in 1925 until his retirement in 1956. He wrote four books and over 200 technical articles, historical essays, and critical reviews for professional journals- many of them in the Bell System Technical Journal. Darrow was a nephew of the famed trial attorney Clarence Darrow.

He was elected to the American Philosophical Society in 1936.

In his book Atomic Energy (1948), which contains four lectures he had given in 1947, he points out that in reality his subject is nuclear energy, but that at the time of the bombing of Hiroshima someone wrote of it as an atomic bomb, and the misusage spread "like a chain reaction". The book includes the following passage:

Here is the climax of my lectures, and here is where you should be frightened; and if I had an orchestral accompaniment, here is where the orchestra would have mounted to a tumultuous fortissimo, with the drums rolling and the trumpets blaring and the tuba groaning and the strings in a frenzy, and whatever else a Richard Wagner could contrive to cause a sense of Gotterdammerung; for, let there be no doubt of it, this is something that could bring on the twilight of civilization. But at this crucial juncture I have only words to serve me, and all the words are spoiled. We speak of an awful headache, a dreadful cold, a frightful bore, and an appalling storm; and now when something comes along that is really awful and dreadful and frightful and appalling, all these words have been devaluated and have no terror in them. I have to fall back on the saying, of unknown origin and dubious value, that the strongest emphasis is understatement. Let then this picture, with its circles and its symbols and its numbers, be considered an emphatic understatement of the most terrific thing yet known to man.

Darrow was elected to the American Academy of Arts and Sciences in 1964.

Darrow died on June 7, 1982, in New York City.

== Bibliography ==
- Introduction to Contemporary Physics, 1926
- Electrical Phenomena in Gases, 1932
- The Renaissance in Physics, MacMillan, 1936
- Atomic Energy, 1948
