= IEEE Transactions on Magnetics =

- Discipline: Magnetism, magnetic materials, engineering, electrical engineering
- Language: English
- Edited by: Amr Adly

Publication details
- History: 1965–present
- Publisher: IEEE Magnetics Society
- Frequency: Monthly
- Impact factor: 2.1 (2022)

Standard abbreviations
- ISO 4: IEEE Trans. Magn.

Indexing
- CODEN: IEMGAQ
- ISSN: 0018-9464
- LCCN: 74004562
- OCLC no.: 44580412

Links
- Journal homepage; Online access

IEEE Transactions on Magnetics is a monthly peer-reviewed scientific journal that covers the basic physics of magnetism, magnetic materials, applied magnetics, magnetic devices, and magnetic data storage. The editor-in-chief is Amr Adly (Cairo University, Egypt).

== Abstracting and indexing ==
The journal is abstracted and indexed in the Science Citation Index, Current Contents/Physical, Chemical & Earth Sciences, Scopus, CSA databases, and EBSCOhost. According to the Journal Citation Reports, the journal has a recent impact factor of 2.1.
