= Soft Magnetic Materials Conference =

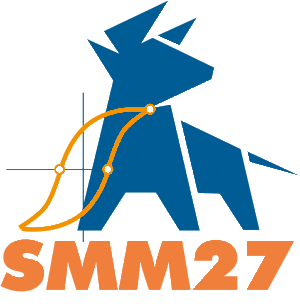
Logo of the SMM27 Conference

The Soft Magnetic Materials Conference, commonly referred to as SMM, is an international conference devoted to all kinds of soft magnetic materials with the emphasis on industrial and applications aspects.

== Format and purpose ==
The SMM is held for three days, every two years, often at the beginning of September in a European country. Each time the SMM has a different logo.

In SMM18 (organised by Wolfson Centre for Magnetics there were 260 participants from over 30 countries. There were 306 scientific papers presented, out of which around 200 are peer reviewed and will be published in Journal of Magnetism and Magnetic Materials, Elsevier at the beginning of 2008.

In the past the SMM proceedings have also been published in IEEE Transactions on Magnetics or other peer reviewed journals.

The SMM is the largest international conference devoted to soft magnetic materials. It has active participation of the academic world as well as of industry, with a high scientific level of contributed and invited communications.

The main aim of the SMM is to bring together engineers and scientists from universities, research institutions and industry who are active in research, development and industrial applications of the materials. The programme of the conference includes invited lectures by academic and industrial experts, oral presentations and poster sessions for regular contributions.

== Scope ==
Typical topics of the SMM are:

- Basic magnetisation processes including domain studies and Barkhausen noise
- Magnetisation characterisation and measurement techniques
- Losses, magnetostriction and B-H properties
- Non-oriented and grain-oriented electrical steels
- Novel and special magnetic materials
- Fe-Ni, Fe-Co, amorphous and nanocrystalline alloys
- Composites, powder cores and ferrites
- Power applications (e.g. motors, transformers and actuators)
- Sensors, high frequency and electronic applications
- Modelling, simulation or prediction of material and device performance
- Design of electromagnetic components and systems
- Energy and environmental aspects

== Dates and locations ==
- 1st SMM, 3–5 September 1973 – Turin, Italy
- 2nd SMM, 9–11 April 1975 – Cardiff, United Kingdom
- 3rd SMM, 14–16 September 1977 – Bratislava, Czechoslovakia
- 4th SMM, 11–14 September 1979 – Münster, Germany
- 5th SMM, 22–25 September 1981 – Grenoble, France
- 6th SMM, 6–9 September 1983 – Eger, Hungary
- 7th SMM, 5–8 September 1985 – Blackpool, United Kingdom
- 8th SMM, 1–4 September 1987 – Badgastein, Austria
- 9th SMM, 6–9 September 1989 – El Escorial, Spain
- 10th SMM, 11–13 September 1991 – Dresden, Germany
- 11th SMM, 29 September – 1 October 1993 – Venice, Italy
- 12th SMM, 12–14 September 1995 – Kraków, Poland
- 13th SMM, 24–26 September 1997 – Grenoble, France
- 14th SMM, 8–10 September 1999 – Balatonfüred, Hungary
- 15th SMM, 5–7 September 2001 – Bilbao, Spain
- 16th SMM, 9–12 September 2003 – Düsseldorf, Germany
- 17th SMM, 7–9 September 2005 – Bratislava, Slovakia
- 18th SMM, 1–3 September 2007 – Cardiff, United Kingdom
- 19th SMM, 7–9 September 2009 – Turin, Italy
- 20th SMM, 2011 18–22 September 2011 – Kos, Greece
- 21st SMM, 2013 1–4 September 2013 – Budapest, Hungary
- 22nd SMM, 2015 13–16 September 2015 – São Paulo, Brazil
- 23rd SMM, 10–13 September 2017 – Seville, Spain
- 24th SMM, 4–7 September 2019 – Poznań, Poland
- 25th SMM, 2–5 May 2022 – Grenoble, France
- 26th SMM, 4–7 September 2023 – Prague, Czech Republic
- 27th SMM, 8–11 September 2025 – Turin, Italy

== Organising committees ==
The conference series has an International Organising Committee, chaired by I. Škorvánek of Košice, Slovakia. The previous chairs were J.M. Barandiaran, of Bilbao, Spain, Anthony J. Moses, of Cardiff, UK, Fausto Fiorillo, of Turin, Italy, and John E. Thompson who was the founder chair.

For each SMM there is a Local Organising Committee (academic and research members of staff of the local university), which is responsible for local arrangements, venue, technical programme, conference dinner, etc.
