= Pacific Coast Gravity Meeting =

Annual physics conference

The Pacific Coast Gravity Meeting is a yearly physics conference held to discuss topics in general relativity.

== Summary ==
List of Meetings
Number	Year	Venue
1	1985	Caltech
2	1986	UC Santa Barbara
3	1987	UC Irvine
4	1988	UC Santa Barbara
5	1989	Caltech
6	1990	University of Oregon
7	1991	Harvey Mudd College
8	1992	University of Utah
9	1993	UC Santa Barbara
10	1994	Oregon State University
11	1995	Caltech
12	1996	University of Utah
13	1997	UC Santa Barbara
14	1998	University of Oregon
15	1999	UC Santa Barbara
16	2000	Caltech
17	2001	UC Santa Barbara
18	2002	UC Davis
19	2003	University of Utah
20	2004	Caltech
21	2005	University of Oregon
22	2006	UC Santa Barbara
23	2007	Caltech
24	2008	UC Santa Barbara
25	2009	University of Oregon
26	2010	UC San Diego
27	2011	Caltech
28	2012	UC Santa Barbara
29	2013	UC Davis
30	2014	UC San Diego
31	2015	University of Oregon
32	2016	CSU Fullerton
33	2017	UC Santa Barbara
34	2018	Caltech
35	2019	Utah State University
36	2020	UC Santa Barbara
37	2021	University of Arizona
38	2022	UC Davis
39	2023	Caltech link
40	2024	UC Santa Barbara link
41	2025	CSU Fullerton link
42	2026	UC Riverside
