= Index of physics articles (I) =

The index of physics articles is split into multiple pages due to its size.

To navigate by individual letter use the table of contents below.

== I ==
- I. M. Dharmadasa
- IBM Zurich Research Laboratory
- ICARUS (experiment)
- ICRANet
- IEEE Antennas & Propagation Society
- IEEE Antennas and Wireless Propagation Letters
- IEEE Council on Superconductivity
- IEEE Electron Devices Society
- IEEE Fellow
- IEEE Journal of Quantum Electronics
- IEEE Journal of Selected Topics in Quantum Electronics
- IEEE Marie Sklodowska-Curie Award
- IEEE Microwave Magazine
- IEEE Microwave and Guided Wave Letters
- IEEE Microwave and Wireless Components Letters
- IEEE Nikola Tesla Award
- IEEE Photonics Award
- IEEE Transactions on Antennas and Propagation
- IEEE Transactions on Applied Superconductivity
- IEEE Transactions on Electron Devices
- IEEE Transactions on Microwave Theory and Techniques
- IEEE Transactions on Semiconductor Manufacturing
- IFAE
- IGNITOR
- II-VI semiconductor
- IKAROS
- INAF
- INDO
- IR/UV mixing
- ISABELLE
- ISIS neutron source
- ISKRA lasers
- ISOLDE
- ISOLTRAP
- ISO 31
- ISO 31-13
- ISO 31-3
- ISO 31-4
- ISO 31-5
- ISO 31-6
- ISO 31-7
- ISO 31-8
- ISO 31-9
- ITER
- IZMIRAN
- Ian Fells
- Ian G. Enting
- Ian Grant (physicist)
- Ice
- IceCube Neutrino Observatory
- Ice II
- Ice III
- Ice IX
- Ice Ic
- Ice Ih
- Ice VII
- Ice VIII
- Ice XI
- Ice XII
- Ice XV
- Ice crystals
- Ice nucleus
- Ice rules
- Ichiji Tasaki
- Ida Noddack
- Ideal gas
- Ideal gas law
- Ideal solution
- Ideally hard superconductor
- Identical particles
- IEEE Microwave and Guided Wave Letters
- Igal Talmi
- Ignace-Gaston Pardies
- Ignacij Klemenčič
- Igor Dmitriyevich Novikov
- Igor Klebanov
- Igor Kurchatov
- Igor Sutyagin
- Igor Tamm
- Igor Ternov
- Il Cimento
- Il Nuovo Cimento
- Il Nuovo Cimento A
- Il Nuovo Cimento B
- Il Nuovo Cimento C
- Il Nuovo Cimento D
- Ille Gebeshuber
- Illuminance
- Ilya Frank
- Ilya Lifshitz
- Ilya Prigogine
- Image-based flow visualization
- Image noise
- Imaginary time
- Imaging spectrometer
- Imbert–Fedorov effect
- Immersed boundary method
- Immersion lithography
- Immirzi parameter
- Immittance
- Immunophysics
- Impact (mechanics)
- Impact ionization
- Impact parameter
- Impact pressure
- Impedance of different devices (derivations)
- Impedance of free space
- Impeller
- Implicate and explicate order according to David Bohm
- Implosion (mechanical process)
- Impulse (physics)
- InHour
- In Search of Schrödinger's Cat
- Incandescence
- Inch of water
- Incoherent scatter
- Incompatible observables
- Incompleteness of quantum physics
- Incompressible flow
- Independent electron approximation
- Index-matching material
- Index of engineering science and mechanics articles
- Index of optics articles
- Index of physics articles
- Index of radiation articles
- India-based Neutrino Observatory
- Indian National Physics Olympiad
- Indian Physical Society
- Indicator diagram
- Indira Gandhi Centre for Atomic Research
- Indium arsenide antimonide phosphide
- Indium gallium arsenide
- Indium gallium phosphide
- Indium nitride
- Induced gamma emission
- Induced gravity
- Induced metric
- Inductance
- Induction heating
- Inductive charging
- Inductive coupling
- Inductively coupled plasma
- Inductively coupled plasma atomic emission spectroscopy
- Inductively coupled plasma mass spectrometry
- Industrial radiography
- Inelastic collision
- Inelastic mean free path
- Inelastic scattering
- Inert-pair effect
- Inertance
- Inertia
- Inertia coupling
- Inertia negation
- Inertia wheel pendulum
- Inertial confinement fusion
- Inertial electrostatic confinement
- Inertial frame of reference
- Inertial fusion power plant
- Inertial space
- Inertial wave
- Inexact differential
- Infiltration (hydrology)
- Infinitesimal strain theory
- Infinity correction
- Infinity focus
- Inflation (cosmology)
- Inflationary epoch
- Inflaton
- Information processing
- Infragravity wave
- Infralateral arc
- Infraparticle
- Infrared
- Infrared Physics and Technology
- Infrared cut-off filter
- Infrared divergence
- Infrared fixed point
- Infrared multiphoton dissociation
- Infrared thermometer
- Infrared window
- Infrasound
- Inge Lehmann
- Inge Schmitz-Feuerhake
- Inglis–Teller equation
- Ingrid Daubechies
- Inhomogeneous
- Inhomogeneous electromagnetic wave equation
- Initial mass function
- Initial singularity
- Initial stability
- Initial value formulation (general relativity)
- Injection kicker magnets
- Injection seeder
- Injector
- Insect flight
- Insertion device
- Insertion time
- Inspiral
- Inspirator
- Instability
- Instant
- Instant Physics
- Instant centre of rotation
- Instantaneous acceleration
- Instanton
- Instanton fluid
- Institut Laue–Langevin
- Institut d'astrophysique de Paris
- Institut de Physique du Globe de Paris
- Institute for High Energy Physics
- Institute for Nuclear Research
- Institute for Physical Problems
- Institute for Plasma Research
- Institute for Quantum Computing
- Institute for Radium Research, Vienna
- Institute for Science and International Security
- Institute for Telecommunication Sciences
- Institute for Transuranium Elements
- Institute of Acoustics, Chinese Academy of Sciences
- Institute of Acoustics (United Kingdom)
- Institute of Astronomy of the Russian Academy of Sciences
- Institute of Atmospheric Physics AS CR
- Institute of Electrical and Electronics Engineers
- Institute of High Energy Physics
- Institute of Physics
- Institute of Physics and Engineering in Medicine
- Institute of Sound and Vibration Research
- Institute of Space Physics (Sweden)
- Instituto de Plasmas e Fusão Nuclear
- Integrable system
- Integral of motion
- Integrated fluidic circuit
- Integrated optical circuit
- Integrating sphere
- Intense Pulsed Neutron Source
- Intensity (physics)
- Intensive and extensive properties
- Interacting boson model
- Interaction
- Interaction-free measurement
- Interaction energy
- Interaction picture
- Interaction point
- Interface conditions for electromagnetic fields
- Interference (wave propagation)
- Interference filter
- Interferometric gravitational wave detector
- Interferometry
- Intermediate-mass black hole
- Intermittency
- Intermodulation
- Intermodulation interference
- Intermolecular force
- Internal conversion
- Internal conversion coefficient
- Internal energy
- Internal flow
- Internal gravity waves
- Internal rotary inspection system
- Internal wave
- International Academy of Astronautics
- International Aerospace Abstracts
- International Association of Mathematical Physics
- International Centre for Diffraction Data
- International Centre for Synchrotron-Light for Experimental Science Applications in the Middle East
- International Commission for Optics
- International Commission on Non-Ionizing Radiation Protection
- International Conference on Differential Geometric Methods in Theoretical Physics
- International Conference on High Energy Physics
- International Conference on Photonic, Electronic and Atomic Collisions
- International Conference on the Physics of Semiconductors
- International Congress on Mathematical Physics
- International Cosmic Ray Conference
- International Fusion Materials Irradiation Facility
- International Geomagnetic Reference Field
- International Heliophysical Year
- International Journal for Numerical Methods in Fluids
- International Journal of Geometric Methods in Modern Physics
- International Journal of Modern Physics
- International Journal of Modern Physics A
- International Journal of Modern Physics B
- International Journal of Modern Physics C
- International Journal of Modern Physics D
- International Journal of Modern Physics E
- International Journal of Nanoscience
- International Journal of Theoretical Physics
- International Linear Collider
- International Liquid Crystal Society
- International Muon Ionization Cooling Experiment
- International Nathiagali Summer College on Physics
- International Physics Olympiad
- International Society on General Relativity and Gravitation
- International Standard Atmosphere
- International System of Units
- International Union of Geodesy and Geophysics
- International conference on Physics of Light–Matter Coupling in Nanostructures
- Interplanetary medium
- Interplanetary scintillation
- Interplanetary Transport Network
- Interpretations of quantum mechanics
- Intersecting Storage Rings
- Interstellar travel
- Intersubband polariton
- Interval (time)
- Intrabeam scattering
- Intracule
- Intrinsic hyperpolarizability
- Intrinsic impedance
- Intrinsic redshift
- Intrinsic semiconductor
- Intrinsic viscosity
- Introduction to M-theory
- Introduction to angular momentum
- Introduction to eigenstates
- Introduction to entropy
- Introduction to gauge theory
- Introduction to general relativity
- Introduction to particles
- Introduction to quantum mechanics
- Introduction to the mathematics of general relativity
- Invariant (physics)
- Invariant interval
- Invariant latitude
- Invariant mass
- Invariant measure
- Invariant speed
- Invention of radio
- Inverse Doppler effect
- Inverse Faraday effect
- Inverse Problems
- Inverse Raman effect
- Inverse dynamics
- Inverse gas chromatography
- Inverse magnetostrictive effect
- Inverse scattering problem
- Inverse scattering transform
- Inverse temperature
- Inversion temperature
- Inversion transformation
- Inverted microscope
- Inverted pendulum
- Inviscid flow
- Ioffe Institute
- Ion-mobility spectrometry
- Ion acoustic wave
- Ion beam
- Ion drift meter
- Ion laser
- Ion notation
- Ion optics
- Ion source
- Ion thruster
- Ion track
- Ion trap
- Ion wind
- Ionic liquid piston compressor
- Ionic polarization
- Ionic potential
- Ionising Radiations Regulations 1999
- Ionization
- Ionization chamber
- Ionization cooling
- Ionization energy
- Ionization gauge
- Ionized-air glow
- Ionizing radiation
- Ionocraft
- Ionogram
- Ionosonde
- Ionosphere
- Ionospheric heater
- Ionospheric pierce point
- Ionospheric storm
- Iosif Khriplovich
- Iraj Malekpour
- Iranian Journal of Physics Research
- Iron oxide nanoparticles
- Iron peak
- Irradiance
- Irradiation
- Irreversible process
- Irvine Clifton Gardner
- Irvine–Michigan–Brookhaven (detector)
- Irving Langmuir
- Irwin G. Priest
- Isaac Abella
- Isaac Chuang
- Isaac Newton
- Isaac Newton Medal
- Isaac Starr
- Isaak Kikoin
- Isaak Markovich Khalatnikov
- Isaak Pomeranchuk
- Isabella Karle
- Isenthalpic process
- Isentropic process
- Ishfaq Ahmad
- Ishrat Hussain Usmani
- Isidor Isaac Rabi
- Isidor Sauers
- Ising critical exponents
- Ising model
- Island growth
- Island of inversion
- Island of stability
- Ismail Akbay
- İsmail Hakkı Duru
- Isobaric process
- Isochoic wave
- Isochoric process
- Isochronous cyclotron
- Isoclinic line
- Isodiapher
- Isodynamic line
- Isoenthalpic process
- Isoenthalpic–isobaric ensemble
- Isogon (geomagnetism)
- Isolated system
- Isolation booth
- Isolator (microwave)
- Isomeric nuclide
- Isomeric shift
- Isomeric transition
- Isopleths
- Isopotential map
- Isoscalar
- Isospin
- Isothermal flow
- Isothermal process
- Isothermal titration calorimetry
- Isothermal–isobaric ensemble
- Isotone
- Isotope
- Isotope-ratio mass spectrometry
- Isotope analysis
- Isotope geochemistry
- Isotope separation
- Isotopic abundance
- Isotopic ratio
- Isotopic shift
- Isotopically pure diamond
- Isotropic coordinates
- Isotropic radiation
- Isotropic radiator
- Isovector
- Istituto Nazionale di Fisica Nucleare
- Italian Physical Society
- Itzhak Bars
- Ivan A. Getting
- Ivan K. Schuller
- Ivan Pulyui
- Ivan Supek
- Ivan Wilhelm
- Ivar Giaever
- Ivar Waller
- Ives–Stilwell experiment
- Iwahashi Zenbei
- Izuo Hayashi
