= List of semiconductor journals =

List of academic journals in semiconductor research

This is a list of semiconductor journals which includes peer-reviewed scientific and engineering journals focused on semiconductor devices, materials, fabrication, and micro/nanoelectronic systems.

== Journals ==
- Foundations and Trends in Electronic Design Automation
- IEEE Electron Device Letters
- IEEE Journal of Quantum Electronics
- IEEE Journal of Solid-State Circuits
- IEEE Transactions on Computer-Aided Design of Integrated Circuits and Systems
- IEEE Transactions on Electron Devices
- IEEE Transactions on Semiconductor Manufacturing
- International Journal of High Speed Electronics and Systems
- Journal of Crystal Growth
- Journal of Electronic Testing
- Journal of Micro/Nanopatterning, Materials, and Metrology
- Journal of Microelectromechanical Systems
- Lab on a Chip
- Microelectronics International
- Radioelectronics and Communications Systems – Ukrainian journal published in the Russian language and translated into English
- Semiconductor Science and Technology

== See also ==
- Lists of academic journals
- List of computer science journals
- List of physics journals
- List of materials science journals
- List of semiconductor fabrication plants
- List of semiconductor materials
- List of semiconductor scale examples
- Semiconductor industry

=== Notable semiconductor conferences ===
- International Electron Devices Meeting
- International Solid-State Circuits Conference
- International Conference on the Physics of Semiconductors
- International Conference on Defects in Semiconductors
- Design Automation Conference
- Asia and South Pacific Design Automation Conference
