= List of nanotechnology journals =

List of academic journals in nanotechnology

List of nanotechnology journals includes notable peer-reviewed scientific journals that publish research related to nanotechnology, including nanoscale materials, nanoelectronics, nanomedicine, and other applications.

== Notable journals ==
- ACS Nano
- Advanced Materials
- Beilstein Journal of Nanotechnology
- IEEE Transactions on Nanotechnology
- International Journal of Nanomedicine
- International Journal of Nanoscience
- Journal of Nanoparticle Research
- Journal of Nanoscience and Nanotechnology
- Nano Letters
- Nano-Micro Letters
- Nano Research
- Nano Today
- Nanomaterials
- Nanoscale
- Nanotechnology
- Nature Nanotechnology
- Small

=== Nanotechnology conferences ===
- International Conference on Nitride Semiconductors
- International conference on Physics of Light–Matter Coupling in Nanostructures
- International Conference on Defects in Semiconductors
- International Symposium on Small Particles and Inorganic Clusters
- NanoGagliato

== See also ==
- Nanotechnology
- Outline of nanotechnology
- List of materials science journals
- List of engineering journals and magazines
