= IPP =

IPP may refer to:

== Organisations ==
- Independent power producer
- India Pride Project, recovering stolen Indian artefacts
- Istituto per la Protezione delle Piante (Institute of Plant Protection), Italy
- Max-Planck-Institut für Plasmaphysik, a physics institute in Garching, Germany
- Intermountain Power Plant, a coal power plant, Delta, Utah, USA.
- Institute of Particle Physics, Canada

== Science and technology ==
- Isopentenyl pyrophosphate, a metabolite
- Ionospheric pierce point, where a satellite signal crosses the ionosphere
- Induratio penis plastica, Peyronie's disease
- Nob Yoshigahara Puzzle Design Competition, also known as the International Puzzle Party

== Sports ==
- International Player Pathway, program for non-Americans players to join the NFL

== Computing ==
- Integrated Performance Primitives, a software library
- Internet Printing Protocol
- Unbounded interactive polynomial time in computational complexity theory

== Politics ==
- Irish Parliamentary Party or Irish Home Rule Party, UK
- Istehkam-e-Pakistan Party, Pakistan
- Iran Prosperity Project, Iran

== Other uses ==
- Illinois Prairie Path, a multi-use trail in the west suburbs of Chicago, Illinois, US
- Imprisonment for public protection, England
- Individual Pension Plan, Canada
- International price program, US
- Intellectual Property Protection
- Integrated Product Policy in Life Cycle Thinking
- David Ipp (1938-2020), judge and politician, NSW, Australia
- Ip, Sălaj (Hungarian Ipp), a commune in Romania
