= Rituparna Kanungo =

Nuclear physicist

- Education: Saha Institute of Nuclear Physics
- Known for: Nuclear halos, rare isotope beams
- Awards: Vogt medal (2018); APS fellowship (2019); CAP fellowship (2024)
- Scientific career
- Fields: Physics
- Workplaces: St. Mary's University, TRIUMF
- Thesis: Studies on breakup phenomena in nuclear reactions with light ions (1999)

Rituparna Kanungo is an Indian Canadian experimental physicist who studies nuclear structure in isotopes which are hard to produce due to their short half-life. She is an assistant director at TRIUMF and the director of its Physical Sciences Division. She was elected a fellow of the American Physical Society in 2019.

== Career ==
Kanungo obtained her PhD from the Saha Institute of Nuclear Physics. She then did postdoctoral work in Germany, including at the GSI Helmholtz Centre for Heavy Ion Research, under an Alexander von Humboldt Fellowship. She also worked at Riken prior to joining the physics faculty at St. Mary's University.

Kanungo became a tenured professor at St. Mary's in 2007. She also became an affiliate scientist at TRIUMF, serving as a principal investigator on the CANREB (CANadian Rare isotope facility with Electron Beam ion source) project. In 2024, she moved to TRIUMF as the Director of the Physical Sciences Division. One of her actions as director was to establish a partnership with the CNRS in France to develop new accelerator technologies.

Kanungo has held board positions with the Institute of Particle Physics and the Canadian Institute of Nuclear Physics. She was also elected to be the Director of International Affairs for the Canadian Association of Physicists (CAP). As of 2025, Kanungo represents Canada in the International Union of Pure and Applied Physics.

== Research ==
Kanungo's main research interest is the structure of unstable nuclei which very often decay before they reach an experimental detector. Using a beam with a yield of a few particles per second in 2009, Kanungo's team showed that ^{24}O (8 protons, 16 neutrons) has a closed nuclear orbital thereby making it a doubly magic nucleus. This overturned previous results which had established 2, 8, 20, 28, 50, 82, 126 as the only magic numbers.

Kaknugo and her postdoc Matthias Holl also published research on nuclear orbitals in ^{8}He. In 2021, they confirmed a theoretical model by finding that the 6 outer neutrons formed a closed shell (as signaled by energy gap measurements) but were not spherically symmetric. More generally, Kanungo studies features of the outermost neutrons in neutron-rich isotopes which are known as nuclear halos.

== Awards ==
Kanungo received the CAP-TRIUMF Vogt Medal in 2018.

As a user of the Facility for Rare Isotope Beams, she was elected an APS fellow in 2019 for "seminal studies of weakly bound nuclei that have challenged our understanding of the nuclear many-body system, and for the development of innovative experimental techniques and approaches used in measurements with rare isotope beams." These contributions were further recognized by a CAP fellowship in 2024.
