= ICDS =

ICDS may stand for:

- Integrated Child Development (Services) Scheme

It was launched in 1975 in 33 community development blocks of the country and now it spread more than 400 CD (Community Development) blocks.

- International Conference on Defects in Semiconductors

The first conference was in 1959 and is a biennial event.
