= Orshansky =

Orshansky may refer to:

- Orshansky District, Russia
- Orshansky Uyezd, Russian Empire
- Orsha District, Belarus
- Orshansky (surname)
