= Eli Barkai =

Israeli physicist

- אלי ברקאי
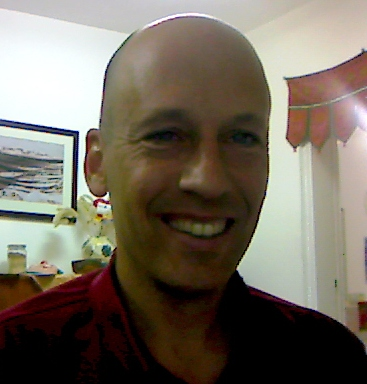
- Eli Barkai
- Education: Tel Aviv University
- Awards: Yeshiahu Horowitz Science of Complexity Fellowship (2004) Krill Prize (2006); Michael Bruno Memorial Award (2009) Friedrich Wilhelm Bessel Research Award (2011)
- Scientific career
- Fields: Physics, statistical mechanics
- Workplaces: MIT; Notre Dame University; Bar Ilan University
- Thesis: Generalized Collision Models Lévy Walk Approach (1998)
- Academic advisors: Bob Silbey

Eli Barkai (Hebrew: אלי ברקאי) is a professor of physics at Bar-Ilan University, located in Ramat-Gan, Israel.

== Education ==
Barkai studied physics in Tel Aviv University, completing his Ph.D. in 1998. He then joined Bob Silbey at MIT for his post-doctoral studies. In 2002 he joined the faculty of Notre Dame University and in 2004 returned to Israel to Bar Ilan University where he became a full professor in 2010.

== Research ==
His main research is in the field of non-equilibrium statistical mechanics. In particular he helped develop the theory of fractional kinetic equations for anomalous diffusion and relaxation, theory of single molecule spectroscopy, and weak ergodicity breaking. Among the physical systems he studied are blinking of quantum dots, the diffusion of cold atoms in atomic traps and the diffusion of single molecules within a live cell.

== Honors and awards ==
Barkai has received several prizes: the Krill prize (2006, selected by the Wolf foundation), the Michael Bruno Memorial award (2009, selected by Yad Hanadiv) and the Friedrich Wilhelm Bessel Research award (2011, selected by the Alexander von Humboldt foundation).

== Family ==
Married to Adina Alster, daughter of Jonas Alster. Barkai has three children
