= Prathima Agrawal =

Indian-American computer engineer

Prathima Agrawal is an Indian-American computer engineer known for her contributions to wireless networking, VLSI, and computer-aided design. She is a professor emerita and the former Samuel Ginn Distinguished Professor of Electrical and Computer Engineering at Auburn University.

== Early life and education ==
Agrawal's father was a chemical engineer; she studied engineering in the 1960s at the Indian Institute of Science in Bangalore, as the only female engineering student there at the time. After earning bachelor's and master's degrees there, she began doctoral study at the University of Rochester in 1967, again as the only woman. She married engineer Vishwani Agrawal after a year, had a son, and left the program, instead earning a second master's degree at the University of Illinois at Urbana–Champaign for work on the ILLIAC IV program.

She returned to India with her new family, but after two years as a housewife, became a doctoral student at the University of Southern California (USC) in 1974, temporarily leaving her husband in India and her son with a sister in New York. She completed her Ph.D. at USC in 1977, under the supervision of Melvin Breuer.

== Career ==
Agrawal became a researcher at Bell Labs in 1978, working on the simulation of large electronic circuits, a problem that led her to the design of single-chip multiprocessors to perform these simulations. In 1992, she became the founding director of a laboratory on networked computing, shifting her interests from circuit design to networking. She moved to Bellcore in 1998, and moved again to Auburn as Samuel Ginn Distinguished Professor and founding director of the Wireless Engineering Research and Education Center in 2003. She retired as a professor emerita in 2014.

== Book ==
With Santosh Kulkarni, Agrawal is the author of Analysis of TCP Performance in Data Center Networks (Springer, 2014). She has also edited several edited volumes.

== Recognition ==
Bell Labs named Agrawal a Distinguished Member of Technical Staff in 1985. She was named an IEEE Fellow in 1989 "for contributions to computer-aided design and testing of integrated circuits", and the IEEE gave her their Third Millennium Medal in 2000. The Indian Institute of Science named her a distinguished alumna in 2008.
