= Michael Orshansky =

American professor of electrical engineering

Michael Orshansky is an American researcher in integrated circuit design, and has been Professor of Electrical and Computer Engineering at The University of Texas at Austin since 2003. He received his undergraduate education and Ph.D. at the UC Berkeley.

His research interests include statistical CAD algorithms for design for manufacturability, robust circuit design in the presence of process variability, low-power circuit design, modeling and characterization of semiconductor devices.

He is a recipient of the 2004 National Science Foundation Early Career Development Award (CAREER award), the 2004 IEEE Transactions on Semiconductor Manufacturing Best Paper Award, the Best Paper Award at the 2005 Design Automation Conference and the annual SIGDA Outstanding New Faculty Award.

== Works ==
- (With Sani Nassifand Duane Boning) (2007) "Design for Manufacturability and Statistical Design: A Constructive Approach", Springer, ISBN 0-387-30928-4
