= Gagliato =

- Comune
- Comune di Gagliato
- Location within Italy Location within Calabria
- Coordinates: 38°40′35″N 16°27′40″E
- Country: Italy
- Region: Calabria
- Province: Catanzaro (CZ)

Area
  - Total: 6 km^{2} (2.3 sq mi)
- Elevation: 480 m (1,570 ft)

Population (31 December 2013)
  - Total: 515
  - Density: 86/km^{2} (220/sq mi)
- Demonym: Gagliatese
- Time zone: UTC+1 (CET)
  - Summer (DST): UTC+2 (CEST)
- Postal code: 88060
- Dialing code: 0967

Gagliato (Calabrian: Gagghiàtu) is a village and comune in the province of Catanzaro, in the Calabria region of southern Italy. In recognition of the unique role that the town has come to play as an international magnet for global leaders in nanotechnology, and as host of the NanoGagliato events, Gagliato has received the official appellation of “Paese delle NanoScienze”, town of Nanosciences, attributed by the City Council.
