= Jonas Alster =

Israeli nuclear physicist

- יונס אלסטר
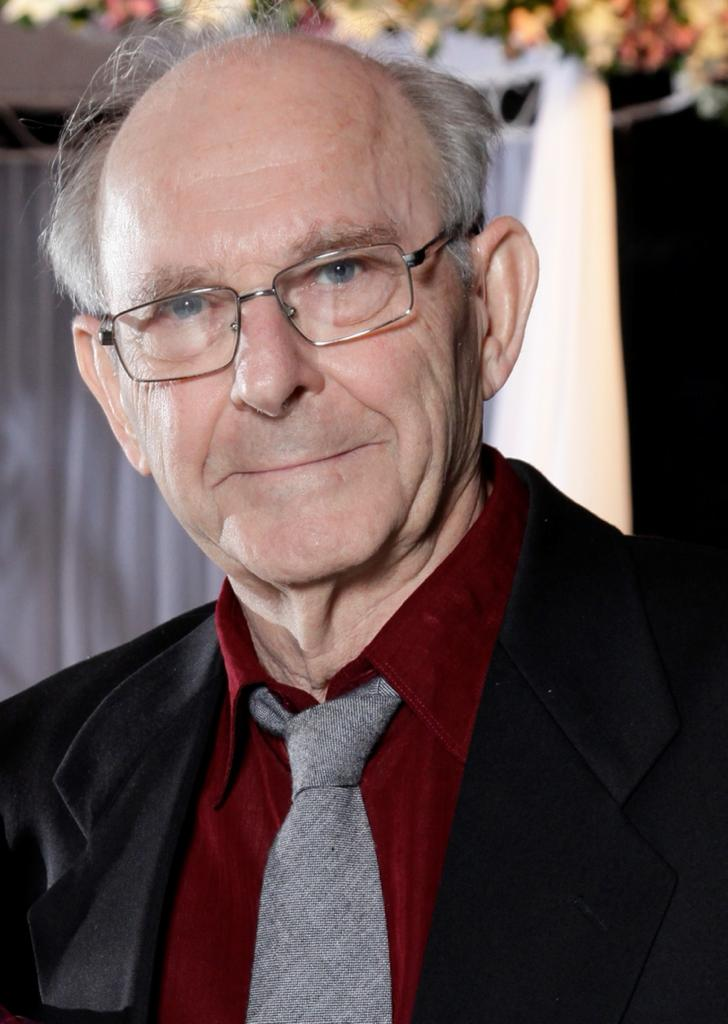
- Born: 18 July 1933 (age 93); Berlin, Germany
- Spouse: Rosette Dasberg
- Scientific career
- Fields: Nuclear physics
- Workplaces: Tel Aviv University

Jonas Alster (Hebrew: יונס אלסטר; born 18 July 1933) is an Israeli nuclear physicist.

== Biography ==
Born in Berlin to an observant Jewish Orthodox family, he is the son of Lidi and Wolf, a merchant in the clothing business. At the age of 4, his family emigrated to Holland, and in 1942 they escaped the Nazis, becoming refugees in Switzerland. He was the first in his family to attend university, earning his Ph.D. in Nuclear Physics in 1961 from the technical university of Delft, via heavy ion scattering experiments carried out at the linear accelerator (Hilac) at Berkeley's Lawrence Radiation Laboratory, under the local supervision of Homer Conzett and the supervision at Delft of Aaldert. Wapstra.

In Amsterdam, he married Rosette Dasberg, and after some academic stops in Berkeley, Seattle, Boston and Paris, he joined the physics faculty at Tel Aviv University (TAU) in 1968, following an invitation by Yuval Ne'eman and Avivi Yavin. Rosette and Jonas have five children. Along his scientific career Jonas, continued to observe the Jewish faith, study the Talmud, and actively participate in Jewish history courses at TAU. Jonas has high level language skills, speaking fluently English, Hebrew, German, Dutch, French, and Yiddish.

== Scientific career ==
Jonas is best known for his discovery at Los Alamos Scientific Laboratory (LASL) of the nuclear isovector giant monopole resonance, studied by the pion-nucleus charge exchange reaction. This discovery was made possible following his efforts with David Bowman, Helmut W. Baer, Martin Cooper and Murray Moinester et al. at LASL and TAU to help design and construct a high resolution neutral pion spectrometer for Nuclear Structure experiments. He also wrote an important review article with Jaime Warszawski on pion-nucleus charge exchange reactions, which discussed his studies of Isovector giant dipole resonances and isobaric analog states. With Homer Conzett, he was among the first to measure and develop theoretical descriptions of heavy ions elastic scattering. He is credited together with Eli Piasetzky, Alan Carroll et al., of the first direct observation at Brookhaven National Laboratory of two-nucleon short range correlations in nuclei using high momentum transfer hard (p,2p) knock-out scattering reactions. With Gerald Peterson, Murray Moinester, and Jechiel Lichtenstadt et al., he made significant contributions to Nuclear Structure via elastic and inelastic electron and alpha scattering, and via direct transfer pickup and stripping reactions. He also contributed with Bruce Barnett et al. at Canada's TRIUMF accelerator to determine neutron and proton radii in nuclei from low energy pion scattering. With Jechiel Lichtenstadt et al., at the Stanford Linear Accelerator Center (SLAC), via deep inelastic electron scattering, he made important contributions to measuring nucleon electric and magnetic form factors, as well as quark and gluon distributions in nucleons.
