= Outline of physics =

Overview of and topical guide to physics

The following outline is provided as an overview of and topical guide to physics:

Physics – natural science that involves the study of matter and its motion through spacetime, along with related concepts such as energy and force. More broadly, it is the general analysis of nature, conducted in order to understand how the universe behaves.

== What type of subject is physics? ==
Physics can be described as all of the following:

- An academic discipline – one with academic departments, curricula and degrees; national and international societies; and specialized journals.
- A scientific field (a branch of science) – widely recognized category of specialized expertise within science, and typically embodies its own terminology and nomenclature. Such a field will usually be represented by one or more scientific journals, where peer-reviewed research is published.
  - A natural science – one that seeks to elucidate the rules that govern the natural world using empirical and scientific methods.
    - A physical science – one that studies non-living systems.
    - A biological science – one that studies the role of physical processes in living organisms. See Outline of biophysics.

== Branches ==
- Astronomy – studies the universe beyond Earth, including its formation and development, and the evolution, physics, chemistry, meteorology, and motion of celestial objects (such as galaxies, planets, etc.) and phenomena that originate outside the atmosphere of Earth (such as the cosmic background radiation).
  - Astrodynamics – application of ballistics and celestial mechanics to the practical problems concerning the motion of rockets and other spacecraft.
  - Astrometry – the branch of astronomy that involves precise measurements of the positions and movements of stars and other celestial bodies.
  - Astrophysics – the study of the physical aspects of celestial objects.
  - Celestial mechanics – the branch of theoretical astronomy that deals with the calculation of the motions of celestial objects such as planets.
  - Extragalactic astronomy – the branch of astronomy concerned with objects outside the Milky Way.
  - Galactic astronomy – the study of our own Milky Way galaxy and all its contents.
  - Physical cosmology – the study of the largest-scale structures and dynamics of the universe, and is concerned with fundamental questions about its formation and evolution.
  - Planetary science – the scientific study of planets (including Earth), moons, and planetary systems, in particular those of the solar system and the processes that form them.
  - Stellar astronomy – natural science that deals with the study of celestial objects (such as stars, planets, comets, nebulae, star clusters, and galaxies) and phenomena that originate outside the atmosphere of Earth (such as cosmic background radiation).
- Atmospheric physics – the study of the application of physics to the atmosphere.
- Atomic, molecular, and optical physics – the study of how matter and light interact.
  - Optics – the branch of physics which involves the behavior and properties of light, including its interactions with matter and the construction of instruments that use or detect it.
- Biophysics – interdisciplinary science that uses the methods of physics to study biological systems
  - Neurophysics – branch of biophysics dealing with the nervous system.
  - Polymer physics – field of physics that studies polymers, their fluctuations, mechanical properties, as well as the kinetics of reactions involving degradation and polymerization of polymers and monomers, respectively.
  - Quantum biology – application of quantum mechanics to biological phenomenon.
- Chemical physics – the branch of physics that studies chemical processes.
- Computational physics – study and implementation of numerical algorithms to solve problems in physics for which a quantitative theory already exists.
- Condensed matter physics – the study of the physical properties of condensed phases of matter.
- Electricity – the study of electrical phenomena.
- Electromagnetism – a branch of science concerned with the forces that occur between electrically charged particles.
- Geophysics – the physics of the Earth and its environment in space; also the study of the Earth using quantitative physical methods.
- Magnetism – the study of physical phenomena that are mediated by magnetic field.
- Mathematical physics – application of mathematics to problems in physics and the development of mathematical methods for such applications, and the formulation of physical theories.
- Mechanics – the branch of physics concerned with the behavior of physical bodies when subjected to forces or displacements, and the subsequent effects of the bodies on their environment.
  - Aerodynamics – study of the motion of air.
  - Biomechanics – the study of the structure and function of biological systems such as humans, animals, plants, organs, and cells using the methods of mechanics.
  - Classical mechanics – one of the two major sub-fields of mechanics, which is concerned with the set of physical laws describing the motion of bodies under the action of a system of forces.
    - Kinematics – branch of classical mechanics that describes the motion of points, bodies (objects), and systems of bodies (groups of objects) without consideration of the causes of motion.
      - Homeokinetics – the physics of complex, self-organizing systems.
  - Continuum mechanics – the branch of mechanics that deals with the analysis of the kinematics and the mechanical behavior of materials modeled as a continuous mass rather than as discrete particles.
  - Dynamics – the study of the causes of motion and changes in motion
  - Fluid mechanics – the study of fluids and the forces on them.
    - Fluid statics – study of fluids at rest
    - Fluid kinematics – study of fluids in motion
    - Fluid dynamics – study of the effect of forces on fluid motion
  - Statics – the branch of mechanics concerned with the analysis of loads (force, torque/moment) on physical systems in static equilibrium, that is, in a state where the relative positions of subsystems do not vary over time, or where components and structures are at a constant velocity.
- Medical Physics – the branch of physics that deals with the application of physics in medicine – such as imaging exams (NMR, PET scans, and so on), radiotherapy, and nuclear medicine.
- Statistical mechanics – the branch of physics that studies any physical system that has a large number of degrees of freedom.
- Thermodynamics – the branch of physical science concerned with heat and its relation to other forms of energy and work.
- Nuclear physics – field of physics that studies the building blocks and interactions of atomic nuclei.
- Particle physics – the branch of physics that studies the properties and interactions of the fundamental constituents of matter and energy.
- Psychophysics – quantitatively investigates the relationship between physical stimuli and the sensations and perceptions they affect.
- Plasma physics – the study of plasma, a state of matter similar to a gas in which a certain portion of the particles are ionized.
- Quantum physics – branch of physics dealing with physical phenomena where the action is on the order of the Planck constant.
  - Quantum field theory – the application of quantum theory to the study of fields (systems with infinite degrees of freedom).
  - Quantum information theory – the study of the information-processing capabilities afforded by quantum mechanics.
  - Quantum foundations – the discipline focusing on understanding the counterintuitive aspects of the theory, including trying to find physical principles underlying them, and proposing generalisations of quantum theory.
- Quantum gravity – the search for an account of gravitation fully compatible with quantum theory.
- Relativity – theory of physics which describes the relationship between space and time.
  - General Relativity – a geometric, non-quantum theory of gravitation.
  - Special Relativity – a theory that describes the propagation of matter and light at high speeds.
- Other
  - Agrophysics – the study of physics applied to agroecosystems
    - Soil physics – the study of soil physical properties and processes.
  - Cryogenics – cryogenics is the study of the production of very low temperature (below −150 °C, −238 °F or 123 K) and the behavior of materials at those temperatures.
  - Econophysics – interdisciplinary research field, applying theories and methods originally developed by physicists to solve problems in economics
  - Materials physics – use of physics to describe materials in many different ways, such as force, heat, light, and mechanics.
  - Vehicle dynamics – dynamics of vehicles, here assumed to be ground vehicles.
- Philosophy of physics – deals with conceptual and interpretational issues in modern physics, many of which overlap with research done by certain kinds of theoretical physicists.

== History ==
History of physics – history of the physical science that studies matter and its motion through space-time, and related concepts such as energy and force

- Physics in the medieval Islamic world
- European science in the Middle Ages
- History of science and technology in China
- History of Indian science and technology

=== History of fields of physics ===
- History of acoustics – history of the study of mechanical waves in solids, liquids, and gases (such as vibration and sound)
- History of agrophysics – history of the study of physics applied to agroecosystems
- History of astrophysics – history of the study of the physical aspects of celestial objects
- History of astronomy – history of the studies the universe beyond Earth, including its formation and development, and the evolution, physics, chemistry, meteorology, and motion of celestial objects (such as galaxies, planets, etc.) and phenomena that originate outside the atmosphere of Earth (such as the cosmic background radiation).
  - History of astrodynamics – history of the application of ballistics and celestial mechanics to the practical problems concerning the motion of rockets and other spacecraft.
  - History of astrometry – history of the branch of astronomy that involves precise measurements of the positions and movements of stars and other celestial bodies.
  - History of cosmology – history of the discipline that deals with the nature of the Universe as a whole.
  - History of the Big Bang theory – origin of the universe
  - History of physical cosmology – history of the study of the largest-scale structures and dynamics of the universe and is concerned with fundamental questions about its formation and evolution.
  - History of planetary science – history of the scientific study of planets (including Earth), moons, and planetary systems, in particular those of the Solar System and the processes that form them.
  - History of stellar astronomy – history of the natural science that deals with the study of celestial objects (such as stars, planets, comets, nebulae, star clusters and galaxies) and phenomena that originate outside the atmosphere of Earth (such as cosmic background radiation)
- History of atomic theory - history of models of the atom
- History of atomic, molecular, and optical physics – history of the study of how matter and light interact
- History of biophysics – history of the study of physical processes relating to biology
- History of condensed matter physics – history of the study of the physical properties of condensed phases of matter.
- History of econophysics – history of the interdisciplinary research field, applying theories and methods originally developed by physicists in order to solve problems in economics
- History of electromagnetism – history of the branch of science concerned with the forces that occur between electrically charged particles.
- History of geophysics – history of the physics of the Earth and its environment in space; also the study of the Earth using quantitative physical methods
- History of gravitational theory – the earliest physics theory with application in daily life through cosmology
- History of mechanics – history of the branch of physics concerned with the behavior of physical bodies when subjected to forces or displacements, and the subsequent effects of the bodies on their environment.
  - History of biomechanics – history of the study of the structure and function of biological systems such as humans, animals, plants, organs, and cells by means of the methods of mechanics.
  - History of classical mechanics – history of one of the two major sub-fields of mechanics, which is concerned with the set of physical laws describing the motion of bodies under the action of a system of forces.
  - History of variational principles in physics – mathematical basis of classical and quantum mechanics.
  - History of fluid mechanics – history of the study of fluids and the forces on them.
  - History of quantum mechanics – history of the branch of physics dealing with physical phenomena where the action is on the order of the Planck constant.
  - History of quantum field theory – modern branch of quantum theory.
  - History of string theory – branch of mathematics driven by open questions in quantum physics
  - History of thermodynamics – history of the branch of physical science concerned with heat and its relation to other forms of energy and work.
- History of nuclear physics – history of the field of physics that studies the building blocks and interactions of atomic nuclei.
- History of nuclear fusion – mechanism powering stars and modern weapons of mass destruction.
- History of electromagnetism – electricity, magnets, and light from radio waves to gamma rays
  - History of Maxwell's equations – classical field equation of electromagnetism
- History of materials science – From stones to silicon, understanding and manipulating matter.
- History of optics – history of the branch of physics which involves the behavior and properties of light, including its interactions with matter and the construction of instruments that use or detect it.
- History of spectroscopy – measuring the response of materials to energy dependent probes of light and matter.
- History of subatomic physics – history of the branch of physics that studies the existence and interactions of particles that are the constituents of what is usually referred to as matter or radiation.
- History of the periodic table – Tabular summary of the relationship between elements.
- History of psychophysics – history of the quantitative investigations of the relationship between physical stimuli and the sensations and perceptions they affect.
- History of special relativity – history of the study of the relationship between space and time in the absence of gravity
  - History of Lorentz transformations – deep dive into one mathematical aspect of special relativity
- History of general relativity – history of the non-quantum theory of gravity
- History of solid-state physics – history of the study of rigid matter, or solids, through methods such as quantum mechanics, crystallography, electromagnetism, and metallurgy.
- History of Solar System formation and evolution hypotheses long enough to explain itself
- History of superconductivity – ultra-cold state of matter.

== General concepts ==
=== Ingredients ===
- physical system - a collection of objects under study,
- physical observation - the study
- physical quantity - a quantified property of an object
- unit of measure - a standard quantity used to compare observations
- mathematical model - an abstract description of a system
- physical experiment - an intervention designed to test a model
- physical constant - a quantified property with no known model
- physical law - a broadly and thoroughly tested model

=== Basic principles ===
Physics – branch of science that studies matter and its motion through space and time, along with related concepts such as energy and force. Physics is one of the "fundamental sciences" because the other natural sciences (like biology, geology etc.) deal with systems that seem to obey the laws of physics. According to physics, the physical laws of matter, energy and the fundamental forces of nature govern the interactions between particles and physical entities (such as planets, molecules, atoms or the subatomic particles). Some of the basic pursuits of physics, which include some of the most prominent developments in modern science in the last millennium, include:

- Describing the nature, measuring and quantifying of bodies and their motion, dynamics etc.
  - Newton's laws of motion
  - Mass, force and weight (mass versus weight)
  - Momentum and conservation of energy
  - Gravity, theories of gravity
  - Energy, work, and their relationship
  - Motion, position, and energy
  - Different forms of Energy, their inter-conversion and the inevitable loss of energy in the form of heat (thermodynamics)
  - Energy conservation, conversion, and transfer.
  - Energy source the transfer of energy from one source to work in another.
- Kinetic molecular theory
  - Phases and states of matter, and phase transitions
  - Temperature and thermometers
  - Energy and heat
  - Heat flow: conduction, convection, and radiation
  - The four laws of thermodynamics
- The principles of waves and sound
- The principles of electricity, magnetism, and electromagnetism
- The principles, sources, and properties of light
- Basic quantities
  - Acceleration
  - Electric charge
  - Energy
  - Entropy
  - Force
  - Length
  - Mass
  - Matter
  - Momentum
  - Potential energy
  - Space
  - Temperature
  - Time
  - Velocity

=== Fundamental concepts ===
- Causality
- Symmetry
- Action
- Covariance
- Space
- Time
- Oscillations and Waves
- Physical field
- Physical interaction
- Statistical ensemble
- Quantum
- Particle

=== Measurement ===
- Measurement
- SI units
- Conversion of units
- Length
- Time
- Mass
- Density

=== Motion ===
- Motion
- Velocity
- Speed
- Acceleration
- Constant acceleration
- Newton's laws of motion

=== Overview ===
This is a list of the primary theories in physics, major subtopics, and concepts.

Note: the Theory column below contains links to articles with infoboxes at the top of their respective pages which list the major concepts.

Theory	Major subtopics	Concepts
Classical mechanics	Newton's laws of motion, Lagrangian mechanics, Hamiltonian mechanics, kinematics, statics, dynamics, chaos theory, acoustics, fluid dynamics, continuum mechanics	Density, dimension, gravity, space, time, motion, length, position, velocity, acceleration, mass, momentum, force, energy, angular momentum, torque, conservation law, harmonic oscillator, wave, work, power
Electromagnetism	Electrostatics, electrodynamics, electricity, magnetism, Maxwell's equations, optics	Capacitance, electric charge, electric current, electrical conductivity, electric field, electric permittivity, electrical resistance, electromagnetic field, electromagnetic induction, electromagnetic radiation, Gaussian surface, magnetic field, magnetic flux, magnetic monopole, magnetic permeability
Theory of relativity	Special relativity, general relativity, Einstein field equations	Covariance, Einstein manifold, equivalence principle, four-momentum, four-vector, general principle of relativity, geodesic motion, gravity, gravitoelectromagnetism, inertial frame of reference, invariance, length contraction, Lorentzian manifold, Lorentz transformation,mass–energy equivalence, metric, Minkowski diagram, Minkowski space, principle of relativity, proper length, proper time, reference frame, rest energy, rest mass, relativity of simultaneity, spacetime, special principle of relativity, speed of light, stress–energy tensor, time dilation, twin paradox, world line
Thermodynamics and statistical mechanics	Heat engine, kinetic theory	Boltzmann constant, conjugate variables, enthalpy, entropy, equation of state, equipartition theorem, first law of thermodynamics, free energy, heat, ideal gas law, internal energy, irreversible process, partition function, pressure, reversible process, second law of thermodynamics, spontaneous process, state function, statistical ensemble, temperature, thermodynamic equilibrium, thermodynamic potential, thermodynamic processes, thermodynamic state, thermodynamic system, third law of thermodynamics, viscosity, zeroth law of thermodynamics
Quantum mechanics	Path integral formulation, scattering theory, Schrödinger equation, quantum field theory, quantum statistical mechanics	Adiabatic approximation, correspondence principle, free particle, Hamiltonian, Hilbert space, identical particles, matrix mechanics, Planck constant, operators, quanta, quantization, quantum entanglement, quantum harmonic oscillator, quantum number, quantum tunneling, Schrödinger's cat, Dirac equation, spin, wavefunction, wave mechanics, wave–particle duality, zero-point energy, Pauli exclusion principle, Heisenberg uncertainty principle

=== Concepts by field ===
Field	Subfields	Major theories	Concepts
Particle physics	Accelerator physics, nuclear physics, nuclear astrophysics, particle astrophysics, particle physics phenomenology	Standard Model, quantum field theory, quantum chromodynamics, electroweak theory, effective field theory, lattice field theory, lattice gauge theory, gauge theory, supersymmetry, Grand Unified Theory, superstring theory, M-theory	Fundamental force (gravitational, electromagnetic, weak, strong), elementary particle, spin, antimatter, spontaneous symmetry breaking, brane, string, quantum gravity, theory of everything, vacuum energy
Atomic, molecular, and optical physics	Atomic physics, molecular physics, atomic and molecular astrophysics, chemical physics, optics, photonics	Quantum optics, quantum chemistry, quantum information science	Atom, molecule, diffraction, electromagnetic radiation, laser, polarization, spectral line, Casimir effect
Condensed matter physics	Solid-state physics, high-pressure physics, low-temperature physics, nanoscale and mesoscopic physics, polymer physics	BCS theory, Bloch's theorem, Fermi gas, Fermi liquid, many-body theory	Phases (gas, liquid, solid, Bose–Einstein condensate, superconductor, superfluid), electrical conduction, magnetism, self-organization, spin, spontaneous symmetry breaking
Astrophysics	Cosmology, gravitation physics, high-energy astrophysics, planetary astrophysics, plasma physics, space physics, stellar astrophysics	Big Bang, Lambda-CDM model, cosmic inflation, general relativity, law of universal gravitation	Black hole, cosmic background radiation, cosmic string, cosmos, dark energy, dark matter, galaxy, gravity, gravitational radiation, gravitational singularity, planet, Solar System, star, supernova, universe, nova

== Lists ==
Index of physics articles

- List of common physics notations
- Lists of physics equations
- List of important publications in physics
- List of laws in science
- List of letters used in mathematics and science
- List of physicists
- List of physics journals
- List of scientific units named after people
- Variables commonly used in physics
- List of physics awards

== See also ==
- Category:Concepts in physics
- Category:Physics-related lists
- Elementary physics formulae
- Glossary of classical physics
- List of physics concepts in primary and secondary education curricula

== Notes ==
=== Works cited ===
- Feynman, R.P.; Leighton, R.B.; Sands, M. (1963). The Feynman Lectures on Physics. Vol. 1. Addison-Wesley. ISBN 978-0-201-02116-5.
- Maxwell, J.C. (1878). Matter and Motion. D. Van Nostrand. ISBN 978-0-486-66895-6. "matter and motion."
