= Tony Rothman =

American novelist

- Born: 29 April 1953 (age 73); Philadelphia
- Education: Swarthmore College (BA); University of Texas at Austin (PhD)
- Occupations: Physicist; cosmologist; science fiction writer
- Writing career
- Genres: Science fiction (hard SF), popular science
- Website: www.tonyrothman.com

Tony Rothman (born 1953) is an American theoretical physicist, academic and writer.

== Early life ==
Tony is the son of physicist and science fiction writer Milton A. Rothman and psychotherapist Doris W. Rothman. He holds a B.A. from Swarthmore College, (1975) and a Ph.D. from the University of Texas at Austin (1981), where he studied at the Center for Relativity under the supervision of its long-time director Richard Matzner. He continued on post-doctoral fellowships at Oxford under Dennis Sciama, Moscow State University under Yakov Zeldovich and the University of Cape Town under George F.R. Ellis.

== Career ==
Rothman worked briefly as an editor at Scientific American, then taught at Harvard, Illinois Wesleyan University, Bryn Mawr College and from 2005 to 2013 at Princeton University. In January 2016 he joined the faculty of NYU Polytech, now known as the Tandon School of Engineering, and retired from teaching there in 2019.

Rothman's scientific research has been concerned mainly with general relativity and cosmology, for which he has made contributions to the study of the early universe, specifically in the areas of cosmic nucleosynthesis, black holes, inflationary cosmology and gravitons.

Rothman was the scientific editor for Andrei Sakharov's Memoirs and he has contributed to numerous magazines, including Scientific American, Discover, American Scientist, The New Republic and History Today. He has played oboe at a professional level and commissioned a concerto from Alexander Raskatov.

== Selected works ==
Tony Rothman's first book, written just after graduating college, was The World is Round (Ballantine, 1978), a science fiction novel about the evolution of society on a non-earthlike planet. His experiences in Russia resulted in publication of a collection of short stories entitled Censored Tales (1989). He has also published six books of popular science and science history. His collection A Physicist on Madison Avenue (1991) was nominated for the Pulitzer Prize, while Doubt and Certainty, with George Sudarshan, was chosen by the A-List as one of the 200 best books of 1998. He co-authored Sacred Mathematics: Japanese Temple Geometry with Fukagawa Hidetoshi. Published in 2008, this was the first history of sangaku in English, and won the Association of American Publisher's 2008 PROSE award for Professional and Scholarly Excellence in mathematics. His play The Magician and the Fool, about Pushkin and Galois, won the 1981 Oxford Experimental Theatre Club competition, and his play The Sand Reckoner, about Archimedes, received a staged reading at Harvard in 1995. He has also written five other plays, on mathematical and musical subjects.

Rothman's published writings encompass hundreds of works in 7 languages and include 3,073 library holdings.

- 2026 — Censored Tales (short stories about Russia; enlarged edition)
- 2022 — A Little Book about the Big Bang
- 2016 — Physics Mastery
- 2015 — The Course of Fortune
- 2015 — Firebird
- 2008 — Sacred Mathematics: Japanese Temple Geometry (with Hidetoshi Fukagawa)
- 2003 — Everything's relative: and other fables from science and technology
- 1998 — Doubt and certainty: the celebrated academy (with E.C.G. Sudarshan)
- 1995 — Instant physics: from Aristotle to Einstein, and beyond
- 1991 — A physicist on Madison Avenue
- 1989 — Science à la mode: physical fashions and fictions
- 1989 — Censored tales
- 1985 — Frontiers of modern physics: new perspectives on cosmology, relativity, black holes, and extraterrestrial intelligence
- 1978 — The World is Round
