= Vishwani Agrawal =

Indian electrical engineer

- Born: 7 February 1943 (age 83); Allahabad, India
- Education: Indian Institute of Technology Roorkee, Indian Institute of Science, Bangalore, University of Illinois at Urbana-Champaign (BS, MS, PhD)
- Awards: 2014 James Monzel Award, IEEE North Atlantic Test Workshop; 2012 Lifetime Contribution Medal, Test Technology Technical Council of the IEEE Computer Society; 2006 Lifetime Achievement Award, VLSI Society of India; 1998, Harry H. Goode Memorial Award IEEE Computer Society.
- Scientific career
- Doctoral advisor: Y. T. Lo

Vishwani D. Agrawal (born 7 February 1943) is the James J. Danaher Professor of Electrical and Computer Engineering at Auburn University. He has over four decades of industry and university experience, including working at Bell Labs, Murray Hill, NJ, Rutgers University, TRW and IIT, Delhi. He is well known as a cofounder and long-term mentor of the International Conference on VLSI Design held annually in India since 1985.

== Education ==
He obtained his BE from the Indian Institute of Technology Roorkee in 1964, ME from the Indian Institute of Science, Bangalore, in 1966; and PhD degree in electrical engineering from the University of Illinois at Urbana-Champaign, in 1971.

== Contributions ==
His research includes investigations on probabilistic aspects of testing, and original contributions in combinational ATPG method for partial-scan circuits, spectral testing methods, adaptive and asynchronous clock testing, hazard-free low-power design, high-speed testing methods.

International Conference on VLSI Design was founded in 1985 and it has influenced the development of electronics industry in India by bringing both top global researchers and practitioners in VLSI. India eventually became a major center of the semiconductor design industry. Intel arrived in India in 1988 and Microsoft in 1990.

== Career ==
He is a co-founder of the International Conference on VLSI Design, and the VLSI Design and Test Symposium, held annually in India. He is the founder and Consulting Editor of the Springer's Frontiers in Electronic Testing Book Series. He is the founder and Editor-in-Chief of the Journal of Electronic Testing: Theory and Applications (since 1990), and a past Editor-in-Chief of the IEEE Design & Test of Computers magazine. He has published over 350 papers, has coauthored five books and holds thirteen US patents. His book, Essentials of Electronic Testing for Digital, Memory and Mixed-Signal VLSI Circuits co-authored with M. L. Bushnell, published in 2000, is a widely used text in hardware testing.

His recent research has focused on optimizing testing in the context of varying clock frequencies and supply voltages.

=== Awards ===
Awards received by him include the 2012 Lifetime Contribution Medal from the Test Technology Technical Council of the IEEE Computer Society, and the 2006 Lifetime Achievement Award of the VLSI Society of India, "in recognition of his contributions to the area of VLSI test and for founding and steering the International Conference on VLSI Design in India", 1998 Harry H. Goode Memorial Award of the IEEE Computer Society for "innovative contributions to the field of electronic testing," 2014 James Monzel Award from the IEEE North Atlantic Test Workshop and 1993 Distinguished Alumnus Award of the University of Illinois at Urbana-Champaign, "in recognition of his outstanding contributions in design and test of VLSI systems." He was made a fellow of IEEE in 1986 and of ACM in 2002.

=== Students and collaborators ===
He has supervised or co-supervised about 40 PhD students. Some of the notable among them are K.-T. Cheng, (PhD 1988, University of California, Berkeley, co-advisor), now professor at UC Santa Barbara, and S. T. Chakradhar, (PhD 1990, Rutgers University, co-advisor) now at NEC labs, Fei Hu (PhD 2006, Auburn, advisor), now at QualComm. He served as a coadvisor for PhD students at prestigious academic institutions even when he was an employee of AT&T Bell labs.

His other collaborators include Dr. Sharad Seth of University of Nebraska-Lincoln and Michael L. Bushnell of Rutgers (later with Spectral Design and Test Inc), both of whom have collaborated extensively with Vishwani Agrawal.

== Personal life ==
He was born in Allahabad, India. He moved to the United States in 1966, however he remained a citizen of India until 2014. He lives in Auburn Alabama with his wife, Prathima Agrawal, formerly Samuel Ginn Distinguished Professor at Auburn University. Their son Vikas Agrawal, a graduate of UC Berkeley Haas School of Business, lives in San Francisco and is the founder of ExpensePath. Their daughter Chitra Agrawal, a graduate of NYU Stern School of Business and former Marketing Director, is now a cookbook author and founder of "Brooklyn Delhi", producing a line of achaars.
