= IEEE Microwave Magazine =

- Discipline: Electronic engineering for microwave, terahertz, and infrared
- Language: English
- Edited by: Robert Caverly

Publication details
- History: 2000-present
- Publisher: IEEE Microwave Theory and Technology Society
- Frequency: Monthly
- Impact factor: 3.6 (2022)

Standard abbreviations
- ISO 4: IEEE Microw. Mag.

Indexing
- ISSN: 1527-3342
- OCLC no.: 424000866

Links
- Journal homepage; Online access

IEEE Microwave Magazine is a professional magazine for the members of IEEE Microwave Theory and Technology Society that is published monthly with several special conference issues. It is also available to others as a part of the IEEE Xplore. In addition to providing societal communications to the MTT-S membership, it has regular columns giving insight into a range of technical and non-technical interests and the publication of technical feature-length articles that provide overviews and tutorials on the state-of-the-art in a given area. Currently, a typical print run is approximately 15,000 issues.

IEEE Microwave Magazine made its debut as a quarterly publication in 2000, changed to bimonthly in 2006 and changed to monthly in 2019. The current editor is Robert Caverly of Villanova University. The Journal Citation Reports 2022 impact factor was 3.6.

== See also ==
- IEEE Transactions on Microwave Theory and Techniques
- IEEE Microwave and Wireless Components Letters
- IEEE Transactions on Terahertz Science and Technology
