= Orshansky (surname) =

Orshansky or Orshanski is a toponymic surname meaning "someone from Orsha". Usually it is a Jewish surname. Belarusian-language form: Arshanski/Arshansky.

- Isaac Orshansky (1851–1923), Russian psychiatrist
- Michael Orshansky, American researcher in integrated circuit design
- Mollie Orshansky (1915–2006), American economist and statistician
- Tommy Arshansky, Israeli judoka
- Tsezar Orshansky, Soviet Ukrainian animated film creator
