= Sacred Mathematics =

Book on Japanese temple geometry problems

- Author: Fukagawa Hidetoshi and Tony Rothman
- Publisher: Princeton University Press
- Publication date: Jul 21, 2008
- Pages: 392
- ISBN: 9780691127453

Sacred Mathematics: Japanese Temple Geometry is a book on Sangaku, geometry problems presented on wooden tablets as temple offerings in the Edo period of Japan. It was written by Fukagawa Hidetoshi and Tony Rothman, and published in 2008 by the Princeton University Press. It won the PROSE Award of the Association of American Publishers in 2008 as the best book in mathematics for that year.

== Topics ==
The book begins with an introduction to Japanese culture and how this culture led to the production of Sangaku tablets, depicting geometry problems, their presentation as votive offerings at temples, and their display at the temples. It also includes a chapter on the Chinese origins of Japanese mathematics, and a chapter on biographies of Japanese mathematicians from the time.

The Sangaku tablets illustrate theorems in Euclidean geometry, typically involving circles or ellipses, often with a brief textual explanation. They are presented as puzzles for the viewer to prove, and in many cases the proofs require advanced mathematics. In some cases, booklets providing a solution were included separately, but in many cases the original solution has been lost or was never provided. The book's main content is the depiction, explanation, and solution of over 100 of these Sangaku puzzles, ranked by their difficulty, selected from over 1800 catalogued Sangaku and over 800 surviving examples. The solutions given use modern mathematical techniques where appropriate rather than attempting to model how the problems would originally have been solved.

Also included is a translation of the travel diary of Japanese mathematician Yamaguchi Kanzan (or Kazu), who visited many of the temples where these tablets were displayed and in doing so built a collection of problems from them. The final three chapters provide a scholarly appraisal of precedence in mathematical discoveries between Japan and the west, and an explanation of the techniques that would have been available to Japanese problem-solvers of the time, in particular discussing how they would have solved problems that in western mathematics would have been solved using calculus or inversive geometry.

== Audience and reception ==
Sacred Geometry can be read by historians of mathematics, professional mathematicians, "people who are simply interested in geometry", and "anyone who likes mathematics", and the puzzles it presents also span a wide range of expertise. Readers are not expected to already have a background in Japanese culture and history. The book is heavily illustrated, with many color photographs, also making it suitable as a mathematical coffee table book despite the depth of the mathematics it discusses.

Reviewer Paul J. Campbell calls this book "the most thorough account of Japanese temple geometry available", reviewer Jean-Claude Martzloff calls it "exquisite, artfull, well-thought, and particularly well-documented",, reviewer Frank J. Swetz calls it "a well-crafted work that combines mathematics, history, and cultural considerations into an intriguing narrative", and reviewer Noel J. Pinnington calls it "excellent and well-thought-out". However, Pinnington points out that it lacks the citations and bibliography that would be necessary in a work of serious historical scholarship. Reviewer Peter Lu also criticizes the book's review of Japanese culture as superficial and romanticized, based on the oversimplification that the culture was born out of Japan's isolation and uninfluenced by the later mathematics of the west.

== Related works ==
This is the third English-language book on Japanese mathematics from Fukagawa; the first two were Japanese Temple Geometry Problems (with Daniel Pedoe, 1989) and Traditional Japanese Mathematics Problems from the 18th and 19th Centuries (with John Rigby, 2002). Sacred Mathematics expands on a 1998 article on Sangaku by Fukagawa and Rothman in Scientific American.
