= Yuen Tze Lo =

Chinese American electrical engineer and academician

- Born: January 31, 1920; Hankou, Hubei, Republic of China
- Died: May 10, 2002 (aged 82)
- Citizenship: United States
- Education: National Southwestern Associated University; University of Illinois at Urbana
- Known for: Broadband television antennas; Theory of microstrip antennas
- Awards: IEEE Antennas and Propagation Society's Distinguished Achievement Award (1996)
- Scientific career
- Fields: Electrical engineering; Antenna theory
- Workplaces: National Tsing Hua University; Channel Master; University of Illinois at Urbana–Champaign
- Thesis: Electromagnetic field of a dipole source above a grounded dielectric slab (1952)
- Doctoral advisor: Ed Jordan
- Doctoral students: Vishwani Agrawal
- Other notable students: Tatsuo Itoh

Yuen Tze Lo (Chinese: 罗远祉; January 31, 1920 – May 10, 2002) was a Chinese American electrical engineer and academician. He was a professor emeritus at the Department of Electrical and Computer Engineering at University of Illinois at Urbana–Champaign. He is best known for his contributions to the theory and design of antennas. He is the editor of the textbook series, Antenna Handbook.

The Yuen T. Lo Outstanding Research Award at University of Illinois at Urbana–Champaign is named after him.

== Biography ==
Lo was born on January 31, 1920, in Hankou, Republic of China. He received his bachelor's degree in electrical engineering from National Southwestern Associated University in 1942. Between 1946 and 1948, he worked at the National Tsing Hua University in Kunming as an instructor; he worked briefly at the Yenching University as well. He obtained his M.S. and PhD degrees in electrical engineering from University of Illinois at Urbana in 1949 and 1952, respectively.

Between 1952 and 1956, Lo worked at Channel Master Corporation at Ellenville, New York, as an engineer. In 1956, Lo joined University of Illinois at Urbana–Champaign as faculty member, conducting research at the Antenna Laboratory. Lo stayed as faculty member at University of Illinois until his retirement in 1990. He was also the director of the Electromagnetics Lab from 1982 to 1990.

Lo had served as a distinguished lecturer in microstrip antenna theory. In 1986, Lo was elected to the National Academy of Engineering, "for inventions and innovative ideas which have advanced significantly the theory and design of antennas and arrays." In 1996, he received IEEE Antennas & Propagation Society's Distinguished Achievement Award for "fundamental contributions to the theory of antenna arrays."

Lo was married to Sara de Mundo and had two children. He died on May 10, 2002.

== Research ==
Lo's research interests included antenna theory, design and applications. He is regarded as the inventor of the broadband television-receiving antenna. In 1959, he designed the University of Illinois's radio telescope, Vermilion Observatory Radio Telescope; the structure was considered to be the largest antenna of the world at that time, prior to the completion of Arecibo Telescope. In the late 1970s, he introduced the cavity-model theory for microstrip-patch antennas. His research work and expertise also involved other microwave structures such as microwave resonators and artificial materials.

In 1958, Lo introduced an early version of method of moments in a course on electromagnetics at University of Illinois.

== Selected publications ==
Articles

- Lo, Y. (May 1960). "On the beam deviation factor of a parabolic reflector". IRE Transactions on Antennas and Propagation. 8 (3): 347–349. Bibcode:1960ITAP....8..347L. doi:10.1109/TAP.1960.1144854.
- Lo, Y.T.; Lee, S.W.; Lee, Q.H. (August 1966). "Optimization of directivity and signal-to-noise ratio of an arbitrary antenna array". Proceedings of the IEEE. 54 (8): 1033–1045. doi:10.1109/PROC.1966.4988.
- Bruning, J.; Lo, Yuen (May 1971). "Multiple scattering of EM waves by spheres part I--Multipole expansion and ray-optical solutions". IEEE Transactions on Antennas and Propagation. 19 (3): 378–390. Bibcode:1971ITAP...19..378B. doi:10.1109/TAP.1971.1139944.
- Lo, Y.; Solomon, D.; Richards, W. (March 1979). "Theory and experiment on microstrip antennas". IEEE Transactions on Antennas and Propagation. 27 (2): 137–145. Bibcode:1979ITAP...27..137L. doi:10.1109/TAP.1979.1142057.
- Richards, W.; Lo, Yuen; Harrison, D. (January 1981). "An improved theory for microstrip antennas and applications". IEEE Transactions on Antennas and Propagation. 29 (1): 38–46. Bibcode:1981ITAP...29...38R. doi:10.1109/TAP.1981.1142524.
- Zhong, S. S.; Lo, Y. T. (April 1983). "Single-element rectangular microstrip antenna for dual-frequency operation". Electronics Letters. 19 (8): 298–300. Bibcode:1983ElL....19..298Z. doi:10.1049/el:19830208.
- Wang, Bao; Lo, Yuen (September 1984). "Microstrip antennas for dual-frequency operation". IEEE Transactions on Antennas and Propagation. 32 (9): 938–943. Bibcode:1984ITAP...32..938W. doi:10.1109/TAP.1984.1143459.
- Aksun, M.I.; Chuang, S.L.; Lo, Y.T. (August 1990). "On slot-coupled microstrip antennas and their applications to CP operation-theory and experiment". IEEE Transactions on Antennas and Propagation. 38 (8): 1224–1230. Bibcode:1990ITAP...38.1224A. doi:10.1109/8.56958.

Books

- Lo, Y.T.; Lee, S.W., eds. (1993). Antenna Handbook: Theory, Applications, and Design. Springer. ISBN 978-1461564614.

Book chapters

- Lo, Y.T.; Wright, S.M.; Navarro, J.A.; Davidovitz, M. (1991). "Microstrip Antennas". In Chang, Kai (ed.). Handbook of Microwave and Optical Components. Wiley. ISBN 978-0471390565.
