= Index of physics articles =

Nature

Physics (Greek: physis–φύσις meaning "nature") is the natural science which examines basic concepts such as mass, charge, matter and its motion and all that derives from these, such as energy, force and spacetime. More broadly, it is the general analysis of nature, conducted in order to understand how the world and universe behave.

The index of physics articles is split into multiple pages due to its size.

To navigate by individual letter use the table of contents below.

== See also ==
- List of basic physics topics
