= Internal conversion coefficient =

Ratio of electron to gamma ray emissions

In nuclear physics, the internal conversion coefficient describes the rate of internal conversion.

The internal conversion coefficient may be empirically determined by the following formula: $\alpha = \frac{\text{number of de-excitations via electron emission}}{\text{number of de-excitations via gamma-ray emission}}$

There is no valid formulation for an equivalent concept for E0 (electric monopole) nuclear transitions.

There are theoretical calculations that can be used to derive internal conversion coefficients. Their accuracy is not generally under dispute, but since the quantum mechanical models they depend on only take into account electromagnetic interactions between the nucleus and electrons, there may be unforeseen effects.

Internal conversion coefficients can be looked up from tables, but this is time-consuming. Computer programs have been developed (see the BrIcc Program) which present internal conversion coefficients quickly and easily.

Theoretical calculations of interest are the Rösel, Hager-Seltzer, and the Band, superseded by the Band-Raman calculation called BrIcc.

The Hager-Seltzer calculations omit the M and higher-energy shells on the grounds (usually valid) that those orbitals have little electron density at the nucleus and can be neglected. To first approximation this assumption is valid, upon comparing several internal conversion coefficients for different isotopes for transitions of about 100 keV.

The Band and Band-Raman calculations assume that the M shell may contribute to internal conversion to a non-negligible extent, and incorporates a general term (called "N+") which takes into account the small effect of any higher shells there may be, while the Rösel calculation works like the Band, but does not assume that all shells contribute and so generally terminates at the N shell.

Additionally, the Band-Raman calculation can now consider ("frozen orbitals") or neglect ("no hole") the effect of the electron vacancy; the frozen-orbitals approximation is considered generally superior.
