= Irwin G. Priest =

American physicist (1886–1932)

- Born: Irwin Gillespie Priest; 27 January 1886; Washington Township, Ohio
- Died: 19 July 1932 (aged 46); Washington, D.C.
- Scientific career
- Fields: Physics

Irwin Gillespie Priest (27 January 1886 – 19 July 1932) was an American physicist who specialized in optics. He was president of the Optical Society of America from 1928 to 1929.

He received his bachelor's degree in 1907 from Ohio University. He went to work for the Bureau of Standards straight from college and after just six years was promoted to Chief of Colorimetry Section of the Optics division. He was named the first honorary lifetime member of the American Oil Chemists' Society in 1913 for his work on oil color grading.

== See also ==
- Optical Society of America#Past Presidents of the OSA
