= Insertion time =

In nuclear weaponry, insertion time is the interval required to rearrange a subcritical mass of fissile material into critical mass.

Appropriate insertion time is one of the three main requirements to create a working fission atomic bomb. The need for a short insertion time with plutonium-239 is the reason the implosion method was chosen for the first plutonium bomb, while with uranium-235 it is possible to use a gun design.

The basic requirements are:

- Start with a subcritical system
- Create a super prompt critical system
- Switch between these two states in a length of time (insertion time) shorter than the time between the random appearance of a neutron in the fissile material through spontaneous fission or by other random processes.
- At the right moment, neutrons must be injected into the fissile material to start the fission process. This can be done by several methods.
  - Alpha emitters such as polonium or plutonium-238 can be rapidly combined with beryllium to create a neutron source.
  - Neutrons can be generated using an electrostatic discharge tube, this tube uses the D-T reaction.
