= NanoGagliato =

NanoGagliato is an invitational gathering of scientists, physicians, business leaders, artists, and researchers to discuss the most current challenges and opportunities in the fields of nanomedicine and the nanosciences, from a multisciplinary perspective. This series of events takes place each year, at the end of July, in the town of Gagliato, Calabria, Italy.

== Format ==
During two days of intense scientific exchanges, the participants to NanoGagliato address the challenges of translating research to the clinic by deploying technological advances born in the field of nanotechnology. On the last two days of the event, the group goes on excursions of renowned localities in Calabria and neighboring regions.

=== Public session ===
The culminating event of NanoGagliato is a town-hall style meeting, traditionally attended by hundreds of people of all ages from Gagliato and neighboring towns. The event is organized in concert with local citizens' associations and public institutions, and is held in Gagalito's town square. Highlights of the attending scientists' research are presented. Time is reserved for an open Q&A session, where members of the public are encouraged to ask about the impact of the presented research, the promise for new treatments for disease, and any ethical concerns.

== Founding session ==
The first NanoGagliato was convened in 2008 by Mauro Ferrari, Ph.D, with the help of his wife, Paola, and hosted at his summer residence in Gagliato. Attendees were asked to provide their own transportation. Several countries were represented, including Japan, the United Kingdom, Portugal, the United States, and France. Hospitality was kindly provided by local private residents.

=== Establishment of L'Accademia di Gagliato delle Nanoscienze ===
At the end of the first NanoGagliato, the participants agreed to establish a non profit association, named L'Accademia di Gagliato delle Nanoscienze, and its children's chapter, La Piccola Accademia. These associations are now the organizers of the events of NanoGagliato, and are supported by donations of individuals and corporations.

== Successive sessions ==
During the 2010 session, four scholarships were awarded to four young Italian researchers in the field of biomedical engineering, in honor of Prof. Salvatore Venuta, the late Magnifico Rettore of the Magna Græcia University of Catanzaro. As part of the award, the finalists were invited to join the NanoGagliato events alongside the scientists.

== Children's activities ==
La Piccola Accademia di Gagliato is the children's chapter of the L' Accademia di Gagliato. The first series of educational activities for schoolchildren was launched in the summer of 2010. Inspired by the NanoDays developed by the NISE (Nanoscale Informal Science Education Network), La Piccola Accademia organized a lively and very successful program including games, presentations, trading cards, and a Q&A session with the scientists. Approximately fifty children from Gagliato and nearby towns attended the first session.

== Recognition of Gagliato ==
In recognition of the unique role that the town of Gagliato has come to play as an international magnet for global leaders in nanotechnology, and as host of the NanoGagliato events, Gagliato has received the official appellation of “Paese delle NanoScienze”, town of Nanosciences, attributed by the City Council.
