= International Journal of Modern Physics =

The International Journal of Modern Physics is a series of physics journals published by World Scientific.

== International Journal of Modern Physics A ==
International Journal of Modern Physics A
- Discipline: Physics
- Language: English
- Edited by: I. Antoniadis, A.P. Balachandran, L. Brink, M. Ninomiya, V.A. Rubakov, P. Sphicas, I. Tsutsui

Publication details
- Publisher: World Scientific
- Impact factor: 1.381 (2020)

Standard abbreviations
- ISO 4: Int. J. Mod. Phys. A
- MathSciNet: Internat. J. Modern Phys. A

Indexing
- ISSN: 0217-751X (print); 1793-656X (web)

Links
- Journal homepage

The International Journal of Modern Physics A was established in 1986, and covers specifically particles and fields, gravitation, cosmology, and nuclear physics.

The journal is abstracted and indexed in:

- Science Citation Index
- Current Contents/Physical, Chemical & Earth Sciences
- Astrophysics Data System (ADS) Abstract Service
- Mathematical Reviews
- Inspec
- Zentralblatt MATH

== International Journal of Modern Physics B ==
International Journal of Modern Physics B
- Discipline: Physics
- Language: English

Publication details
- History: 1987–present
- Publisher: World Scientific
- Impact factor: 1.219 (2020)

Standard abbreviations
- ISO 4: Int. J. Mod. Phys. B
- MathSciNet: Internat. J. Modern Phys. B

Indexing
- ISSN: 0217-9792 (print); 1793-6578 (web)

Links
- Journal homepage

The International Journal of Modern Physics B was established in 1987. It covers specifically developments in condensed matter, statistical and applied physics, and high Tc superconductivity.

The journal is abstracted and indexed in:

- Science Citation Index
- Current Contents/Physical, Chemical & Earth Sciences
- Astrophysics Data System (ADS) Abstract Service
- Chemical Abstracts Service
- Mathematical Reviews
- Inspec
- CSA Meteorological & Geoastrophysical Abstracts
- Zentralblatt MATH
- Scopus

== International Journal of Modern Physics C ==
International Journal of Modern Physics C
- Discipline: Physics
- Language: English

Publication details
- History: 1990–present
- Publisher: World Scientific
- Impact factor: 1.176 (2020)

Standard abbreviations
- ISO 4: Int. J. Mod. Phys. C
- MathSciNet: Internat. J. Modern Phys. C

Indexing
- ISSN: 0217-9792 (print); 1793-6578 (web)

Links
- Journal homepage

The International Journal of Modern Physics C was established in 1990. It covers specifically computational physics, physical computation and related subjects, with topics such as astrophysics, computational biophysics, materials science, and statistical physics.

The journal is abstracted and indexed in:

- Scopus
- Science Citation Index
- CompuMath Citation Index
- Current Contents/Physical, Chemical & Earth Sciences
- Computer & Control Abstracts
- Electrical & Electronics Abstracts
- Physics Abstracts
- Energy Science and Technology Database
- Astrophysics Data System (ADS) Abstract Service
- Mathematical Reviews
- Inspec
- CSA Meteorological & Geoastrophysical Abstracts
- Zentralblatt MATH

== International Journal of Modern Physics D ==
International Journal of Modern Physics D
- Discipline: Physics
- Language: English

Publication details
- Publisher: World Scientific
- Impact factor: 2.461 (2020)

Standard abbreviations
- ISO 4: Int. J. Mod. Phys. D
- MathSciNet: Internat. J. Modern Phys. D

Indexing
- ISSN: 0218-2718 (print); 1793-6594 (web)

Links
- Journal homepage

The International Journal of Modern Physics D was established in 1992. It covers specifically gravitation, astrophysics and cosmology, with topics such as general relativity, quantum gravity, cosmic particles and radiation.

The journal is abstracted and indexed in:

- Science Citation Index
- ISI Alerting Services
- Current Contents/Physical, Chemical & Earth Sciences
- Astrophysics Data System (ADS) Abstract Service
- Mathematical Reviews
- Inspec
- Zentralblatt MATH

== International Journal of Modern Physics E ==
International Journal of Modern Physics E
- Discipline: Physics
- Language: English

Publication details
- History: 1992–present
- Publisher: World Scientific (Singapore)
- Impact factor: 1.174 (2020)

Standard abbreviations
- ISO 4: Int. J. Mod. Phys. E
- MathSciNet: Internat. J. Modern Phys. E

Indexing
- ISSN: 0218-3013 (print); 1793-6608 (web)

Links
- Journal homepage

The International Journal of Modern Physics E was established in 1992. It covers specifically topics on experimental, theoretical and computational nuclear science, and its applications and interface with astrophysics and particle physics.

The journal is abstracted and indexed in:

- Current Contents/Physical, Chemical & Earth Sciences
- Astrophysics Data System (ADS) Abstract Service
- Inspec

== International Journal of Modern Physics: Conference Series ==
International Journal of Modern Physics: Conference Series
- Language: English

Standard abbreviations
- ISO 4: Int. J. Mod. Phys.: Conf. Ser.

Indexing
- ISSN: 2010-1945

The International Journal of Modern Physics: Conference Series publishes conference proceedings and the proceedings of other live events on the subject of physics. It is an open access journal, and its first issue was in 2011.

The journal is abstracted and indexed in:

- Academic OneFile
- Astrophysics Data System (ADS) Abstract Service
- Baidu
- Chemical Abstracts Service
- CNKI Scholar
- CnpLINKer
- CrossRef
- Dimensions
- Ebsco Discovery Service
- Ebsco Electronic Journal Service (EJS)
- ExLibris Primo Central
- Google Scholar
- IAEA INIS (International Nuclear Information System)
- High-Energy Physics Literature Database (INSPIRE)
- Inspec
- J-Gate
- Naver
- Norwegian Register for Scientific Journals (NSD)
- NSTL - National Science and Technology Libraries
- OCLC WorldCat
- The Summon Service
- Conference Proceedings Citation index (indexed — selected articles, starting from Volume 39)
