= Intracule =

An intracule is a quantum mechanical mathematical function for the two electron density which depends not upon the absolute values of position or momentum but rather upon their relative values. Its use is leading to new methods in physics and computational chemistry to investigate the electronic structure of molecules and solids. These methods are a development of Density functional theory (DFT), but with the two electron density replacing the one electron density.
