= International conference on Physics of Light–Matter Coupling in Nanostructures =

- Abbreviation: PLMCN
- Discipline: Solid State Physics

Publication details
- Publisher: Wiley-VCH Physica Status Solidi and Elsevier Superlattices and Microstructures
- History: 2000–
- Frequency: Annual

The International Conference on Physics of Light–Matter Coupling in Nanostructures (PLMCN) is a yearly academic conference on various topics of semiconductor science and nanophotonics.

== Topic ==
The conferences are devoted to the fundamental and technological issues relevant to the realization of a new generation of optoelectronic devices based on advanced low-dimensional and photonic structures, such as low threshold polariton lasers, new optical switches, single photon emitters, photonic band-gap structures, etc. They review the most recent achievements in the fundamental understanding of strong light–matter coupling, and follow the progress in the development of epitaxial and processing technologies of wide-bandgap semiconductors and organic nanostructures and microcavities providing the basis for advanced optical studies. The conferences are open to new emerging fields such as carbon nanotubes and quantum information.

The scope of these conferences covers both physics and application of a variety of phenomena related to light–matter coupling in solids such as:

- Light–matter coupling in microcavities and photonic crystals
- Basic exciton–polariton physics
- Bose–Einstein condensates and polariton superfluid
- Spin-related phenomena
- Physics and application of quantum dots
- Plasmons and near-field optics in light matter coupling
- Growth and characterization of advanced wide-bandgap semiconductors (GaN, ZnSe, ZnO, organic materials)
- Novel optical devices (polariton lasers, single-photon emitters, entangled-photon pair generators, optical switches...)
- Quantum information science

== Editions ==
The International Conference on Physics of Light–Matter Coupling in Nanostructures started in 2000 in Saint-Nectaire, France. The 14th edition was held as PLMCN14 instead of PLMCN13. The next issue in 2015 was held as PLMCN2014 instead of PLMCN15. The next issue after that was, confusingly, labeled as both PLMCN2015 and PLMCN16. The next conference, PLMCN17, reverted to the traditional labeling but now in sync with the edition number. The pattern broke again with PLMCN2020 for the 21st edition which was held online due to the COVID-19 pandemic, instead of in Clermont-Ferrand as initially planned. No conference was scheduled for 2021, to avoid holding another PLMCN online, and thus, the PLMCN22 in Cuba got back in sync, this time both with the year (2022) and the edition number (22nd).

List of previous editions:

1. PLMCN0: Saint-Nectaire, France (2000)
2. PLMCN1: Rome, Italy (2001)
3. PLMCN2: Rethymno, Greece (2002)
4. PLMCN3: Acireale, Italy (2003)
5. PLMCN4: Saint Petersburg, Russia (2004)
6. PLMCN5: Glasgow, Scotland (2005)
7. PLMCN6: Magdeburg, Germany (2006)
8. PLMCN7: Havana, Cuba (2007)
9. PLMCN8: Tokyo, Japan (2008)
10. PLMCN9: Lecce, Italy (2009)
11. PLMCN10: Cuernavaca, Mexico (2010)
12. PLMCN11: Berlin, Germany (2011)
13. PLMCN12: Hangzhou, China (2012)
14. PLMCN14: Hersonissos, Greece (2013)
15. PLMCN2014: Montpellier, France (2014)
16. PLMCN16: Medellín, Colombia (2015)
17. PLMCN17: Nara, Japan (2016)
18. PLMCN18: Würzburg, Germany (2017)
19. PLMCN19: Chengdu, China (2018)
20. PLMCN20: Moscow and Suzdal, Russia (2019)
21. PLMCN2020: online (Clermont-Ferrand host), France (2020)
22. PLMCN22: Varadero, Cuba (2022)
23. PLMCN23: Medellín, Colombia (2023)
24. PLMCN24: Tbilisi, Georgia (9–13 April 2024)

Next scheduled edition:

- PLMCN25: Xiamen, China (8–13 April 2025)

== Logo ==
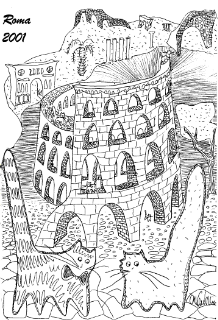
2001 logo

The logo is a cat that travels around the world featuring each particular venue's folklore. It is designed every year by Alexey Kavokin (University of Southampton), one of the creators and chairmen of the conference.

== See also ==
- International Conference on the Physics of Semiconductors
