= International Conference on Differential Geometric Methods in Theoretical Physics =

International Conference on Differential Geometric Methods in Theoretical Physics are congresses held every few years on the subject of Differential geometric methods in Theoretical physics. Lectures, seminars, and discussions are held in different universities throughout the world, every few years, and a book compilation is published thereafter consisting of the papers submitted and discussed at the conference.

== Works ==
=== 1981 ===
- Conference on Differential Geometric Methods in Theoretical Physics

International Centre for Theoretical Physics, Trieste, 30 June-3 July 1981
by G. Denardo; H. D. Doebner; International Centre for Theoretical Physics.
Type: Book
Language: English
Publisher: Singapore : World Scientific, ©1983.
ISBN 9971-950-58-8
ISBN 978-9971-950-58-3
OCLC: 9738857

=== 13th ===
- International Conference on Differential Geometric Methods in Theoretical Physics

Proceedings of the XIII International Conference on Differential Geometric Methods in Theoretical Physics
[eds.] Heinz Dietrich Doebner, Tchavdar D. Palev
(13th: 1984: Shumen, Bulgaria)
(Singapore: World Scientific, 1986)
ISBN 9971-5-0070-1
ISBN 978-9971-5-0070-2
ISBN 9971-5-0071-X
ISBN 978-9971-5-0071-9

=== 14th ===
- International Conference on Differential Geometric Methods in Mathematical Physics

Proceedings of the 14th International Conference on Differential Geometric Methods in Theoretical Physics held in Salamanca, Spain, June 24–29, 1985
edited by Pedro Luis García Pérez and A. Pérez-Rendón
(14th: 1985: Salamanca, Spain)
(Berlin; New York: Springer-Verlag, 1987)
Notes: Series: Lecture Notes in Mathematics (Springer-Verlag); 1251

=== 15th ===
- International Conference on Differential Geometric Methods in Theoretical Physics

Proceedings of the XV International Conference on Differential Geometric Methods in Theoretical Physics
edited by H.D. Doebner, J.D. Hennig
(15th: 1986: Clausthal-Zellerfeld, Germany)
(Singapore: World Scientific, 1987)
ISBN 9971-5-0328-X

=== 16th ===
- International Conference on Differential Geometrical Methods in Theoretical Physics

Proceedings of the NATO Advanced Research Workshop and the 16th International Conference on Differential Geometrical Methods in Theoretical Physics
edited by K. Bleuler, M. Werner
(16th: 1987: Como, Italy)
(Dordrecht; Boston :Kluwer Academic Publishers, 1988)
ISBN 90-277-2820-8

Notes: "Proceedings of the NATO Advanced Research Workshop and the 16th International Conference on Differential Geometrical Methods in Theoretical Physics, Como, Italy, 24–29 August 1987"--T.p. verso.

=== 17th ===
- Proceedings of the XVII International Conference on Differential Geometric Methods in Theoretical Physics

Chester, England 15–19 August 1988
by Allan I. Solomon
Type: Book
Language: English
Publisher: Singapore; Teaneck, N.J. : World Scientific, ©1989.
ISBN 9971-5-0836-2
ISBN 978-9971-5-0836-4
OCLC: 123106675

=== 18th ===
- International Conference on Differential Geometric Methods in Theoretical Physics: Physics and Geometry

Differential Geometric Methods in Theoretical Physics: Physics and Geometry
Proceedings of the NATO Advanced Research Workshop and the 18th International Conference on Differential Geometric Methods in Theoretical Physics: Physics and Geometry
(18th: 1988: University of California, Davis)
edited by Ling-Lie Chau and Werner Nahm
North Atlantic Treaty Organization. Scientific Affairs Division.
(New York: Plenum Press, 1990)
ISBN 0-306-43807-0

Notes: "Proceedings of the NATO Advanced Research Workshop and the 18th International Conference on Differential Geometric Methods in Theoretical Physics: Physics and Geometry, held July 2–8, 1988, at the University of California, Davis, Davis, California"--T.p. verso.
"Published in cooperation with NATO Scientific Affairs Division."

=== 19th ===
- International Conference on Differential Geometric Methods in Theoretical Physics

Differential Geometric Methods in Theoretical Physics
Proceedings of the 19th International Conference held in Rapallo, Italy, 19–24 June 1990
(19th: 1990: Rapallo, Italy)
eds. Claudio Bartocci, Ugo Bruzzo, Roberto Cianci
(Berlin; New York: Springer-Verlag, 1991
ISBN 3-540-53763-5
ISBN 0-387-53763-5

Notes: Papers from the 19th International Conference on Differential Geometric Methods in Theoretical Physics.

=== 20th ===
- International Conference on Differential Geometric Methods in Theoretical Physics

Proceedings of the Xxth International Conference on Differential Geometric Methods in Theoretical Physics, June 3–7, 1991, New York City, USA
eds. Sultan Catto, Alvany Rocha
(World Scientific Pub. Co., Inc., 1992)
ISBN 981-02-0993-2

=== 21st ===
- International Conference on Differential Geometric Methods in Theoretical Physics

Proceedings of the XXI International Conference on Differential Geometric Methods in Theoretical Physics: Tianjin, China, 5–9 June 1992
(21st: 1992: Tianjin, China)
editors, Chen Ning Yang, Mo-Lin Ge, X.W. Zhou
Related name: Hsing-wei Chou
(Singapore; River Edge, NJ: World Scientific, 1993)
ISBN 981-02-1210-0

=== 22nd ===
- Proceedings of the XXIIth International Conference on Differential Geometric Methods in Theoretical Physics

Ixtapa-Zihuatanejo, México, September 20–24, 1993
by J. Keller; Zbigniew Oziewicz
Type: Book
Language: English
Publisher: México, D.F. : Universidad Nacional Autónoma de México, ©1994.
ISBN 968-36-4137-7
ISBN 978-968-36-4137-3
ISBN 968-36-3845-7
ISBN 978-968-36-3845-8
OCLC: 32555470

=== 23rd ===
- Differential Geometry and Physics:

Proceedings of the 23rd International Conference of Differential Geometric Methods in Theoretical Physics
(Nankai Tracts in Mathematics)
eds. Mo-Lin Ge and Weiping Zhang
(World Scientific Publishing Company (December 30, 2006))
ISBN 981-270-377-2
