= IEEE Transactions on Applied Superconductivity =

- Discipline: Superconductivity
- Language: English
- Edited by: Min Zhang

Publication details
- History: 1991–present
- Publisher: IEEE Council on Superconductivity
- Frequency: Bimonthly
- Impact factor: 1.949 (2022)

Standard abbreviations
- ISO 4: IEEE Trans. Appl. Supercond.

Indexing
- CODEN: ITASE9
- ISSN: 1051-8223 (print); 1558-2515 (web)
- LCCN: 91642212
- OCLC no.: 22134485

Links
- Journal homepage; Online access

IEEE Transactions on Applied Superconductivity is a bimonthly peer-reviewed scientific journal covering research on applications of superconductivity and other relevant technology. Electronic applications include analog and digital circuits employing thin films and active devices such as Josephson junctions. Large-scale applications include magnets for power applications such as motors, generators, magnetic resonance, accelerators, and cable applications such as power transmissions. The journal was established in 1991 and is published by the IEEE Council on Superconductivity. The editor-in-chief is Prof Min Zhang (University of Strathclyde).

The journal exhibited unusual levels of self-citation and its journal impact factor of 2019 was suspended from Journal Citation Reports in 2020, a sanction that hit 34 journals in total. The journal was returned to the 2020 Journal Citation Reports index in 2021, and has remained in the index since then.
