= Journal of Electronic Testing =

Scientific journal on electronics

- Discipline: Electronics testing, electronics engineering
- Language: English
- Edited by: Vishwani Agrawal

Publication details
- History: 1986—present
- Publisher: Springer
- Frequency: Bimonthly
- Impact factor: 1.3 (2024)

Standard abbreviations
- ISO 4: J. Electron. Test.

Indexing
- ISSN: 0923-8174 (print); 1573-0727 (web)

Links
- Journal homepage; Online access; Online archive

Journal of Electronic Testing: Theory and Applications is a peer-reviewed scientific journal published bimonthly by Springer Science+Business Media. Established in 1990, it covers developments in electronics testing, including tests of VLSI devices and printed circuit boards, as well as fault modeling and analysis. Its current editor-in-chief is Vishwani Agrawal (Auburn University).

== Abstracting and indexing ==
The journal is abstracted and indexed in:

- Current Contents/Electronics & Telecommunications Collection
- Current Contents/Engineering/Computing & Technology
- EBSCO databases
- Ei Compendex
- Inspec
- ProQuest databases
- Science Citation Index Expanded
- Scopus

According to the Journal Citation Reports, the journal has a 2024 impact factor of 1.3.
