= Instant Physics =

Book by Tony Rothman

- Author: Tony Rothman
- Language: English
- Subject: Mathematics, physics
- Published: 1995 (Ballentine/Fawcett)
- Publication place: United States
- Pages: 242
- ISBN: 9780449906972
- OCLC: 32103203

Instant Physics (full title: Instant Physics: From Aristotle to Einstein, and Beyond) is a book by Tony Rothman first published by Fawcett Columbine in 1995. The book, meant for readers with a minimal amount of mathematical training, consists of ten chapters that cover most of the essential topics in physics, from classical mechanics and thermodynamics to nuclear physics, general relativity, and quantum mechanics. It has proven very popular with the public, and as of 2017 remains in print.
