= Institute for Telecommunication Sciences =

The Institute for Telecommunication Sciences (ITS) is a scientific research laboratory that performs research and engineering in telecommunications as part of the U.S. Government.

The ITS performs research on the behavior of radio waves and performance of end-to-end RF systems. The institute also conducts research and engineering related to telecommunications technology in the United States.

== Overview ==
The Institute for Telecommunication Sciences (ITS) is the research and engineering laboratory of the National Telecommunications and Information Administration (NTIA), part of the U.S. Department of Commerce (DOC). The ITS supports NTIA's telecommunications objectives such as advancing the development of telecommunications and information infrastructure in the United States, and enabling effective use of the radio spectrum.

ITS also provides support for addressing the telecommunications concerns of other federal agencies, state and local governments, private corporations and associations, and international organizations. These concerns typically involve areas of communications technology use (including RF, PSTN and IP/IT).

== Federal Technology Transfer Act ==
Technology transfer is the process by which technology developed in one organization or context is applied in another. This process facilitates the movement of technology from federal laboratories to industry and to state and local governments.

Cooperative research agreements based on the Federal Technology Transfer Act of 1986 are the principal means of aiding the private sector. This act provides the legal basis for and encourages shared use of government facilities and resources with the private sector in advanced telecommunications technologies. These partnerships aid in the commercialization of new products and services.

== Program areas ==
As of 2009, the institute's technical activities were organized into four program areas: Spectrum and Propagation Measurements; Telecommunications and Information Technology Planning; Telecommunications Engineering, Analysis, and Modeling; and Telecommunications Theory.

=== Facilities ===
The institute's facilities and capabilities include audio-visual laboratories, the Public Safety RF Laboratory, Public Safety Audio and Video Laboratories, the Radio Spectrum Measurement Science (RSMS) Program, a Secure Internet (SIPRNET), the Table Mountain Field Site/Radio Quiet Zone, and Telecommunications Analysis Services.

=== Staff ===
ITS employs federal employees, which includes electronics engineers, mathematicians, physicists, computer scientists, and administrative staff.

== Sponsors ==
=== Government ===
The DOC and other federal agencies sponsor the activities and programs of the institute. Agency sponsors providing significant support include the National Institute of Standards and Technology's Office of Law Enforcement Standards, the Department of Homeland Security, the Department of Transportation, the Department of Defense, the National Archives, and the National Weather Service.

=== Industry ===
ITS supports private sector telecommunications research through cooperative research and development agreements (CRADAs) based on the Federal Technology Transfer Act of 1986. The act encourages sharing government facilities and expertise to support in the commercialization of new products and services. ITS is a member of the Federal Laboratory Consortium for Technology Transfer (FLC), formally chartered by the Federal Technology Transfer Act in 1986. CRADAs with other research organizations, telecommunications service providers, and equipment manufacturers support technology transfer and commercialization of telecommunications products and services, which are goals of the DOC. ITS has entered CRADAs with various companies across the telecommunications sector.

== History ==
Radio propagation research by the U.S. Department of Commerce (DOC) dates to 1909, when the National Bureau of Standards made measurements of very long radio waves that travel round the Earth guided between the ground and the ionosphere.

Before World War II, a center for research on radio transmission began under the leadership of Dr. J. H. Dellinger. This group developed techniques that were incorporated into military radar and radio systems during World War II, and developed applications such as long range aircraft beacons. In 1942, the Interservice Radio Propagation Laboratory was set up from this activity to provide the Joint Chiefs of Staff, military operating services, and the National Defense Research Committee research and services in radio wave propagation to enable more effective communications and radar. Following the war, upon endorsement by the Joint Chiefs of Staff and agreement of civilian federal agencies concerned with radio telecommunications, this laboratory was set up as the Central Radio Propagation Laboratory (CRPL) with the mission to provide radio research and services, including wave propagation prediction and studies of optimum frequencies for transmission.

After eight years in Washington, D.C., the CRPL moved to Boulder, Colorado, a relatively radio-quiet region at the foothills of the Rocky Mountains, where the climate and terrain allow a variety of propagation experiments and field radio research projects. In September 1954, President Eisenhower dedicated the NBS Radio Building that is still home to [the] ITS. At the time of CPRL's move to Boulder, its Radio Standards Program split off and became a separate operating unit within NBS, eventually giving rise to various specialized laboratories or sections within what is now the National Institute of Standards and Technology (NIST).

In 1954, CRPL consisted of two research divisions: Radio Propagation Physics and Radio Propagation Engineering. A third division, Radio Systems, was set up in 1959. By this time, government leaders recognized a need to better understand both the upper atmosphere and space following the advent of ballistic missiles, and in 1960 the Upper Atmosphere and Space Physics Division and the Ionosphere Research and Propagation Division were formed from the Radio Propagation Physics Division.

A major reorganization took place in October 1965, when the first Assistant Secretary of Commerce for Science and Technology unified geophysics research in the Department of Commerce (DOC) under the new Environmental Science Services Administration (ESSA) Institutes for Environmental Research (IER). ESSA comprised the Weather Bureau, the Coast and Geodetic Survey, and CRPL—which had been renamed the Institute for Telecommunication Sciences and Aeronomy (ITSA). ESSA Research Laboratories (ERL) was organized to provide a national focus to describe, understand, and predict the state of the oceans, the state of the upper and lower atmosphere, and the size and shape of the earth.

Two years later, ITSA underwent its own change: two of its telecommunications-oriented laboratories (focused on ionospheric and tropospheric propagation, respectively) joined to form the Institute for Telecommunication Sciences (ITS). ITSA's aeronomy activities were spun off within ESSA into the Aeronomy Laboratory, eventually giving rise to various specialized laboratories when ESSA was reorganized into the National Oceanic and Atmospheric Administration (NOAA) in October 1970.

Throughout the late 1960s, the U.S. Government focused attention on the field of telecommunications, often described as an emerging "Age of Information". In December 1967 the Department of Commerce established an Office of Telecommunications (OT), and then in September 1970, the Executive Office of the President established the Office of Telecommunications Policy (OTP). To support OTP, the Secretary of Commerce was assigned additional responsibilities, and to meet those demands, the DOC's Office of Telecommunications was given expanded authority and responsibilities, and the Institute for Telecommunication Sciences was transferred from ESSA to OT.

The President's Reorganization Act #1 of 1977 merged the Office of Telecommunications and the Office of Telecommunications Policy to form the National Telecommunications and Information Administration (NTIA). In March 1978, ITS joined the new agency. Henceforth, it would no longer be associated with NBS.

The institute's role was to administer the NTIA's telecommunications technology research programs and also provide, on a reimbursable basis, technical research support for offices in the NTIA as well as for other agencies. Among carrying out other assigned tasks, the institute was to remain “... the central Federal Government laboratories for research on transmission of radio waves.”

Today, the ITS continues to manage the telecommunications research programs of NTIA; provide fundamental and applied engineering research support for NTIA offices and other federal agencies, including assisting them to develop and apply emerging communication technologies; and support technology transfer to industry. Organizationally, the institute has grown to four technical divisions and one administrative division, but it continues to address challenges related to the radio spectrum.

The activities of the Institute's 1977 research portfolio continue to this day. The objective of these activities, as articulated in the FY 1978 Technical Progress Report, is “Research and engineering for increasing the availability of the spectrum by scientific and engineering techniques, and in overcoming natural, engineering and cost factors limiting the performance of telecommunication systems.”

== Critique of Domestic technology transfer ==
- Bozeman, Barry (April 21, 2000). "Technology transfer and public policy: a review of research and theory" (PDF). Research Policy. 29 (4–5): 627–655. doi:10.1016/S0048-7333(99)00093-1. Archived from the original (Cited by 470. Free PDF download) on July 20, 2011.
- Schacht, Wendy H. (November 5, 2009), Technology Transfer: Use of Federally Funded Research and Development (Congressional Research Service report for Congress. Free PDF download)
