= Isochoic wave =

Type of ultrasound wave

Isoechoic wave is a term used in ultrasound. A tissue or structure having the same level of brightness as the surrounding tissue are classified as isoechoic.

Isoechoic in ultrasound means that two structures have the same echogenicity in 2D mode (B-mode).
