= Isoscalar =

In particle physics, isoscalar refers to the scalar transformation of a particle or field under the SU(2) group of isospin. Isoscalars are a singlet state, with total isospin 0 and the third component of isospin 0, much like a singlet state in a 2-particle addition of spin. Mesons which have all flavor quantum numbers equal to zero, are known as isoscalars.

== See also ==
- Isovector
