= Internal conversion =

Process where an excited nucleus ejects an orbital electron from its atom

Internal conversion (often abbreviated IC) is an atomic decay process where an excited nucleus interacts electromagnetically with one of the orbital electrons of an atom. This causes the electron to be emitted (ejected) from the atom. Thus, in internal conversion, a high-energy electron is emitted from the excited atom, but not from the nucleus. For this reason, the high-speed electrons resulting from internal conversion are not called beta particles, since the latter come from beta decay, where they are newly created in the nuclear decay process.

IC is possible whenever gamma decay is possible, except if the atom is fully ionized. In IC, the atomic number does not change, and thus there is no transmutation of one element to another. Also, neutrinos and the weak force are not involved in IC.

Since an electron is lost from the atom, a hole appears in an electron aura which is subsequently filled by other electrons that descend to the empty, yet lower energy level, and in the process emit characteristic X-ray(s), Auger electron(s), or both. The atom thus emits high-energy electrons and X-ray photons, none of which originate in that nucleus. The atom supplies the energy needed to eject the electron, which in turn causes the latter events and the other emissions.

Since primary electrons from IC carry a fixed (large) part of the characteristic decay energy, they have a discrete energy spectrum, rather than the spread (continuous) spectrum characteristic of beta particles. Whereas the energy spectrum of beta particles plots as a broad hump, the energy spectrum of internally converted electrons plots as a single sharp peak (see example below).

== Mechanism ==
In the quantum model of the electron, there is non-zero probability of finding the electron within the nucleus. In internal conversion, the wavefunction of an inner shell electron (usually an s electron) penetrates the nucleus. When this happens, the electron may couple to an excited energy state of the nucleus and take the energy of the nuclear transition directly, without an intermediate gamma ray being first produced. The kinetic energy of the emitted electron is equal to the transition energy in the nucleus, minus the binding energy of the electron to the atom.

Most IC electrons come from the K shell (the 1s state), as these two electrons have the highest probability of being within the nucleus. However, the s states in the L, M, and N shells (i.e., the 2s, 3s, and 4s states) are also able to couple to the nuclear fields and cause IC electron ejections from those shells (called L or M or N internal conversion). Ratios of K-shell to other L, M, or N shell internal conversion probabilities for various nuclides have been prepared.

An amount of energy exceeding the atomic binding energy of the s electron must be supplied to that electron in order to eject it from the atom to result in IC; that is to say, internal conversion cannot happen if the decay energy of the nucleus is less than a certain threshold.

Though s electrons are more likely for IC due to their superior nuclear penetration compared to electrons with greater orbital angular momentum, spectral studies show that p electrons (from shells L and higher) are occasionally ejected in the IC process. There are also a few radionuclides in which the decay energy is not sufficient to convert (eject) a 1s (K shell) electron, and these nuclides, to decay by internal conversion, must decay by ejecting electrons from the L or M or N shells (i.e., by ejecting 2s, 3s, or 4s electrons) as these binding energies are lower.

After the IC electron is emitted, the atom is left with a vacancy in one of its electron shells, usually an inner one. This hole will be filled with an electron from one of the higher shells, which causes another outer electron to fill its place in turn, causing a cascade. Consequently, one or more characteristic X-rays or Auger electrons will be emitted as the remaining electrons in the atom cascade down to fill the vacancies.

== Example: decay of ^{203}Hg ==
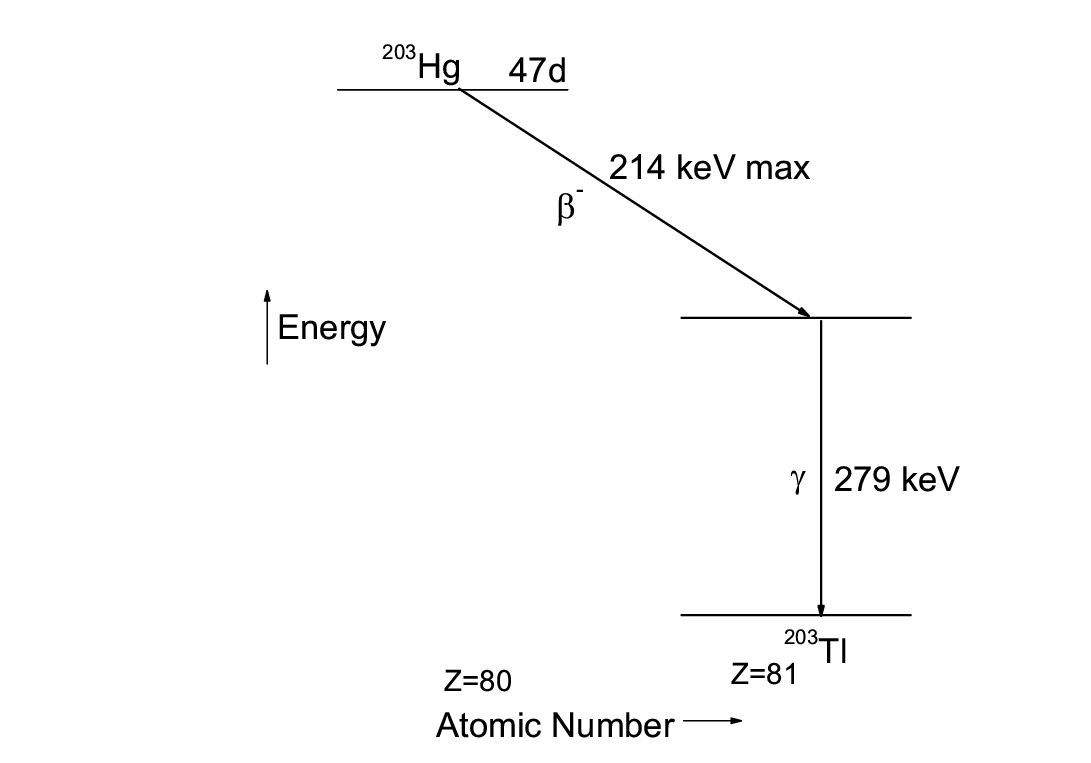
Decay scheme of ^{203}Hg

Electron spectrum of ^{203}Hg, according to Wapstra et al., Physica 20 (1954) 169

The decay scheme on the left shows that ^{203}Hg produces a continuous beta spectrum with maximum energy 214 keV, that leads to an excited state of the daughter nucleus ^{203}Tl. This state decays very quickly (within 2.8×10^{−10} s) to the ground state of ^{203}Tl, emitting a gamma quantum of 279 keV.

The figure on the right shows the electron spectrum of ^{203}Hg, measured by means of a magnetic spectrometer. It includes the continuous beta spectrum and K-, L-, and M-lines due to internal conversion. Since the binding energy of the K electrons in ^{203}Tl is 85 keV, the K line has an energy of 279 − 85 = 194 keV. Due to lesser binding energies, the L- and M-lines have higher energies. Due to the finite energy resolution of the spectrometer, the "lines" have a Gaussian shape of finite width.

== When the process is expected ==
Internal conversion is favored whenever the energy available for a gamma transition is small, and it is also the primary mode of de-excitation for 0^{+}→0^{+} (i.e. E0) transitions. The 0^{+}→0^{+} transitions occur where an excited nucleus has zero-spin and positive parity, and decays to a ground state which also has zero-spin and positive parity (such as all nuclides with even number of protons and neutrons). In such cases, de-excitation cannot take place by emission of a gamma ray, since this would violate conservation of angular momentum, hence IC predominates (the simultaneous emission of two photons is allowed, and observed for atomic transitions with insufficient energy to eject an electron, but IC is faster). This also shows that internal conversion (contrary to its name) is not a two-step process where a gamma ray would be first emitted and then converted.

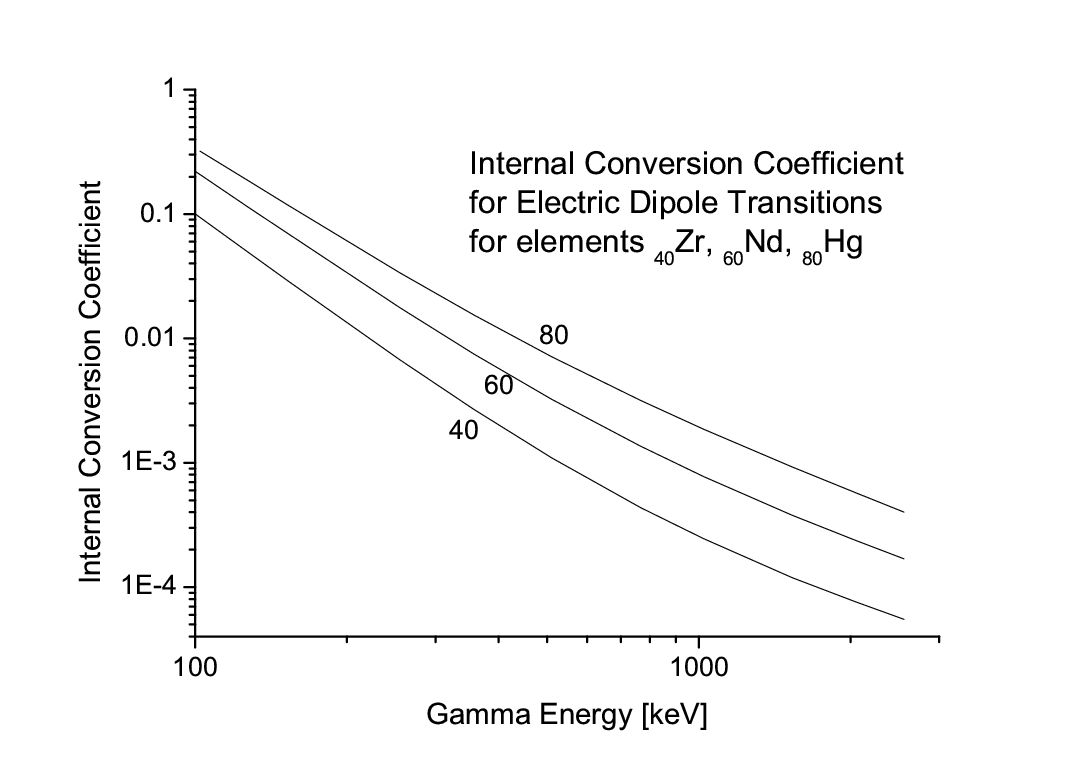
Internal Conversion Coefficient for E1 transitions for Z = 40, 60, and 80 according to the tables by Sliv and Band, as a function of the transition energy.

The competition between IC and gamma decay is quantified in the form of the internal conversion coefficient which is defined as $\alpha = e/{\gamma}$ where $e$ is the rate of conversion electrons and $\gamma$ is the rate of gamma-ray emission observed from a decaying nucleus. For example, in the decay of the excited state at 35 keV of ^{125}Te (which is produced by the decay of ^{125}I), 7% of decays emit energy as a gamma ray, while 93% release energy as conversion electrons. Therefore, this excited state of ^{125}Te has an IC coefficient of $\alpha = 93/7 = 13.3$.

For increasing atomic number (Z) and decreasing gamma-ray energy, IC coefficients increase. For example, calculated IC coefficients for electric dipole (E1) transitions, for Z = 40, 60, and 80, are shown in the figure.

The energy of the emitted gamma ray is a precise measure of the difference in energy between the excited states of the decaying nucleus. In the case of conversion electrons, the binding energy must also be taken into account: The energy of a conversion electron is given as $E = (E_i - E_f)-E_B$, where $E_i$ and $E_f$ are the energies of the nucleus in its initial and final states, respectively, while $E_B$ is the binding energy of the electron.

== Similar processes ==
Nuclei with zero-spin and high excitation energies (more than about 1.022 MeV) also can't rid themselves of energy by (single) gamma emission due to the constraint imposed by conservation of momentum, but they do have enough decay energy to decay by pair production. In this type of decay, an electron and positron are both emitted from the atom at the same time, and conservation of angular momentum is solved by having these two product particles spin in opposite directions.

IC should not be confused with the similar photoelectric effect. When a gamma ray emitted by the nucleus of an atom hits another atom, it may be absorbed producing a photoelectron of well-defined energy (this used to be called "external conversion"). In IC, however, the process happens within one atom, and without a real intermediate gamma ray.

Just as an atom may produce an IC electron instead of a gamma ray if energy is available from within the nucleus, so an atom may produce an Auger electron instead of an X-ray if an electron is missing from one of the low-lying electron shells. (The first process can even precipitate the second one.) Like IC electrons, Auger electrons have a discrete energy, resulting in a sharp energy peak in the spectrum.

Electron capture also involves an inner shell electron, which in this case is retained in the nucleus (changing the atomic number) and leaving the atom (not nucleus) in an excited state. The atom missing an inner electron can relax by a cascade of X-ray emissions as higher energy electrons in the atom fall to fill the vacancy left in the electron cloud by the captured electron. Such atoms also typically exhibit Auger electron emission. Electron capture, like beta decay, also typically results in excited atomic nuclei, which may then relax to a state of lowest nuclear energy by any of the methods permitted by spin constraints, including gamma decay and internal conversion decay.

== See also ==
- Internal conversion coefficient
