= International Journal for Numerical Methods in Fluids =

Journal

- Discipline: Computational fluid dynamics
- Language: English
- Edited by: Alina Bruma

Publication details
- History: 1981–present
- Publisher: John Wiley & Sons
- Frequency: 36/year
- Impact factor: 1.8 (2024)

Standard abbreviations
- ISO 4: Int. J. Numer. Methods Fluids
- MathSciNet: Internat. J. Numer. Methods Fluids

Indexing
- CODEN: IJNFDW
- ISSN: 0271-2091
- LCCN: 81649775
- OCLC no.: 06569528

Links
- Journal homepage; Online access; Online archive

The International Journal for Numerical Methods in Fluids is a peer-reviewed scientific journal covering developments in numerical methods applied to fluid dynamics. It is published by John Wiley & Sons. Its editors-in-chief is Alina Bruma. The journal was established in 1981.

== Abstracting and indexing ==
The journal is abstracted and indexed in:

- Current Contents/Engineering, Computing & Technology
- EBSCO databases
- Ei Compendex
- Inspec
- MathSciNet
- ProQuest databases
- Science Citation Index Expanded
- Scopus
- zbMATH Open

According to the Journal Citation Reports, the journal has a 2024 impact factor of 1.8.
