= Institute of Particle Physics =

Scientific Organization in Canada

- Institut de Physique des Particules
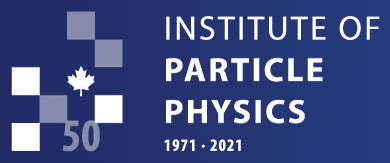
- Abbreviation: IPP
- Formation: 1971; 55 years ago
- Purpose: Scientific outreach and advocacy
- Region served: Canada
- Official language: English, French
- Director: Carsten Krauss
- Website: http://www.particlephysics.ca

The Institute of Particle Physics (IPP) is a Canadian organization that fosters expertise in particle physics research and advanced education. IPP is a nonprofit organization operated by the institutional and individual members for the benefit of particle physics research in Canada. IPP supported projects can be accessed on the group's website. Currently, the IPP Scientific Council administers the IPP Research Scientist Program. The IPP director and council focus on future planning, advocacy with funding sources, and on its activities in international public relations.

== History ==
The IPP was established in 1971 to administer anticipated funds from the National Research Council Canada to steer the Canadian program working at Fermilab, Argonne National Lab, and SLAC National Accelerator Laboratory. IPP formed a Scientific Council, elected by the membership, to be responsible for the Scientific program and the operation of the institute. IPP council vetted projects and advocated within the funding regime and internationally. Eventually, the Natural Sciences and Engineering Research Council (NSERC) developed better communication with, and funding model for, experimental groups, alleviating the need for IPP to directly administer research grant funds.

== Community support ==
=== Long range planning ===
An important part of the Institute of Particle Physics’ mission is to coordinate community input for long range planning exercises. This involves solicitations of community input, hosting of town hall meetings where the projects underway and future projects are discussed, and the concerns of the community can be aired. This input results in the preparation of a brief, usually solicited by NSERC, that serves as input to the Subatomic Physics long range planning exercise.

=== IPP Early Career Theory Fellowship ===
The Institute of Particle Physics Early Career Theory Fellowship is designed to enable outstanding theory PhD students and postdoctoral researchers to be present for a period at an international university, laboratory, or institute. The purpose of the fellowship is to encourage scientific collaboration between theorists in Canada and those abroad, and also to enhance the career prospects of the junior researcher.

=== IPP high school teacher awards ===
The Institute of Particle Physics has supported Canadian high school teachers attending the CERN high school teacher program.

=== IPP summer student program ===
The Institute of Particle Physics supports Canadian undergraduate students participating in the CERN summer student program.
