= International Conference on Defects in Semiconductors =

- Abbreviation: ICDS
- Discipline: Materials Science Solid State Physics

Publication details
- History: 1959–
- Frequency: Biennial

The International Conference on Defects in Semiconductors (ICDS) is a long running series of scientific meetings which focuses on research into point and extended defects in semiconductors. It developed as a spin off from the International Conference on the Physics of Semiconductors, remaining a satellite meeting from the first conference on Radiation Effects in Semiconductors in Gatlinburg in 1959 (now known as ICDS 1) until becoming a separate meeting for ICDS 16. The ICDS covers both basic and applied research topics, with special emphasis on applications of results to semiconducting materials and semiconductors-based device functionality. Traditionally, the ICDS has been held every 2 years in various cities around the world with frequent associated proceedings.

The most recent ICDS (the 33nd) was at Fudan University, Shanghai, September 15−19th, 2025. Both the Corbett and Haller prizes were awarded at the meeting.

The next ICDS (34) will be at the University of Strathclyde, Glasgow between July 26−29th, 2027, and will include a tutorial day on the 25th.

== Corbett Prize ==
The Corbett Prize is awarded at the meetings to a young scientist for an outstanding contribution given at the ICDS. The prize is named in memory of James W. Corbett, one of the pioneers in the field of defects in semiconductors, who was known for helping and encouraging young researchers. The prize has been awarded at every ICDS since 1995.

=== Recipients ===
Year	Location	Awardee(s)	Notes
2025	Fudan University, Shanghai, China	Igor Prozheev	University of Helsinki
2025	Fudan University, Shanghai, China	Menglin Huang	Fudan University
2023	Rehoboth Beach, Delaware, United States	Brendan McCullian	University of Cornell
2023	Rehoboth Beach, Delaware, United States	Fangzhou Zhao	UCSB, Santa Barbara
2021	Oslo, Norway	Robert Karsthof	Post-Doc at Centre for Materials Science and Nanotechnology Physics, University of Oslo (PhD in 2018)
2019	Seattle, United States	Kunal Mukherjee	UCSB, Santa Barbara
2019	Seattle, United States	Christian Zimmermann	University of Oslo, Norway
2017	Matsue, Japan	Liwen Sang,	Independent scientist at National Institute for Materials Science, Japan (PhD in 2010)
2017	Matsue, Japan	Elena Pascal	Post-doctoral researcher, Material Science and Engineering, Carnegie Mellon, USA
2015	Espoo, Finland	Thomas Auzelle,	Scientist at Paul Drude Institute in Berlin, Germany (PhD in 2015)
2015	Espoo, Finland	Jan E. Stehr	Assistant Prof at Linköping University (PhD in 2011)
2013	Bologna, Italy	Daniel José da Silva	Post-Doc at KU Leuven (PhD in 2014)
2011	Nelson, New Zealand	Ben Green	Research scientist at Element Six, UK (PhD in 2013)
2009	St Petersburg, Russia	Yoshihiro Gohda	Professor at Tokyo Institute of Technology, Japan (PhD in 2003)
2009	St Petersburg, Russia	Pavel Petrov	Senior Scientist at Ioffe Institute, Russia (PhD in 2001)
2007	Albuquerque, United States	Fadwa El-Mellouhi	Senior Scientist at Qatar Energy and Environment Research Institute, Qatar (PhD in 2006)
2005	Awaji Island, Japan	Hannes Raebiger	Professor at Yokohama National University, Japan (PhD in 2006)
2005	Awaji Island, Japan	Savas Berber	Professor at Gebze Technical University, Turkey (PhD in 2004)
2005	Awaji Island, Japan	Sukit Limpijumnong	Professor at Suranaree University of Technology, Thailand (PhD in 2000)
2003	Aarhus, Denmark	Naoki Fukata	Group leader at National Institute for Materials Science, Japan (PhD in 1998)
2001	Giessen, Germany	Yong-Sung Kim	Principal Researcher at Korea Research Institute of Standards and Science, South Korea (PhD in 2002)
2001	Giessen, Germany	Benjamin Hourahine	Senior Lecturer at University of Strathclyde (PhD in 2000)
1999	California, United States	Ant Ural	Professor at University of Florida (PhD in 2001)
1997	Aveiro, Portugal	Joanne E. Gower	King's College London
1997	Aveiro, Portugal	Tomas Hallberg	Linköping University, Deputy Research Director at Swedish Defence Research Agency (PhD in 1995)
1997	Aveiro, Portugal	Tomi Mattila	Helsinki University of Technology, Senior Scientist at VTT Technical Research Centre of Finland (PhD in 1997)
1995	Sendai, Japan	Yasunori Mochizuki	Vice President for Central Research Laboratories, NEC (PhD in 1987)
1995	Sendai, Japan	Kohei M. Itoh	Professor at Keio University, Japan (PhD in 1994)

== Haller Prize ==
Eugene E. Haller was a major figure in the semiconductor community and an inspiring mentor for students. The Haller Prize is given to the best graduate student(s) presentation at each ICDS since 2023.

=== Recipients ===
Year	Location	Awardee(s)	Notes
2025	Fudan, China	Christopher Dawe	University of Manchester
2025	Fudan, China	Iuliia Zhelezova	University of Helsinki
2023	Rehoboth Beach, United States	Sarah Thompson	University of Pennsylvania
2023	Rehoboth Beach, United States	Igor Prozheev	University of Helsinki

== Conference locations ==
The ICDS venue often rotates between locations in Europe, North America and the far East.

Conference name	Location	Dates	Proceedings
ICDS 35	Okayama, Japan	29 July–3 August 2029	
ICDS 34	(United Kingdom) Glasgow, Scotland	26–30 July 2027	
ICDS 33	Fudan University, Shanghai China	14–19 September 2025	J. of Semiconductors
ICDS 32	Delaware, United States	10–15 September 2023	J. Appl. Phys.
ICDS 31	Oslo, Norway	25–30 July 2021	J. Appl. Phys.
ICDS 30	Seattle, United States	21–26 July 2019	J. Appl. Phys.
ICDS 29	Matsue, Japan	31 July–4 August 2017	J. Appl. Phys.
ICDS 28	Espoo, Finland	27–31 July 2015	J. Appl. Phys
ICDS 27	Bologna, Italy	21–26 July 2013	AIP Conference Proceedings
ICDS 26	Nelson, New Zealand	17–22 July 2011	Physica B
ICDS 25	St Petersburg, Russia	20–24 July 2009	Physica B
ICDS 24	Albuquerque, United States	22–37 July 2007	Physica B
ICDS 23	Awaji Island, Japan	24–29 July 2005	Physica B
ICDS 22	Århus, Denmark	28 July–1 August 2003	Physica B
ICDS 21	Giessen, Germany	16–20 July 2001	Physica B
ICDS 20	Berkeley, California, United States	26–30 July 1999	Physica B
ICDS 19	Aveiro, Portugal	21–25 July 1997	Trans Tech
ICDS 18	Sendai, Japan	23–28 July 1995	Trans Tech
ICDS 17	Gmunden, Austria	18–23 July 1993	Trans Tech
ICDS 16	Bethlehem, Pennsylvania, United States	22–26 July 1991	Trans Tech
ICDS 15	Budapest, Hungary	22–26 August 1988	Trans Tech
ICDS 14	Paris, France	18–22 August 1986	Trans Tech
ICDS 13	Coronado, California, United States	12–17 August 1984	Metallurgical Society of AIME
ICDS 12	Amsterdam, Netherlands	12 August–3 September 1982	Physica B+C
ICDS 11	Oiso, Japan	8–11 September 1980	Institute of Physics Publishing
ICDS 1	Gatlinburg, Tennessee, United States	May 1959	J. Appl. Phys.

== Related Conferences ==
- The Gordon Research Conferences host a regular semiconductor defect meeting in alternating years to the ICDS.
- The Extended Defects in Semiconductors conference (EDS).

== See also ==
- Semiconductors
- Doping (semiconductor)
- Crystallographic defect
