= IEEE Transactions on Electron Devices =

- Discipline: Electronics
- Language: English
- Edited by: Albert Wang

Publication details
- Former name: IRE Transactions on Electron Devices
- History: 1952-present
- Publisher: IEEE Electron Devices Society (USA)
- Frequency: Monthly
- Open access: Hybrid
- Impact factor: 3.2 (2024)

Standard abbreviations
- ISO 4: IEEE Trans. Electron Devices

Indexing
- CODEN: IETDAJ
- ISSN: 0018-9383
- LCCN: sn78000467
- OCLC no.: 755663637

Links
- Journal homepage; Online access

IEEE Transactions on Electron Devices (T-ED) is a monthly peer-reviewed scientific journal publishes original and significant contributions relating to the theory, modeling, design, performance and reliability of electron and ion integrated circuit devices and interconnects, involving insulators, metals, organic materials, micro-plasmas, semiconductors, quantum-effect structures, vacuum devices, and emerging materials with applications in bioelectronics, biomedical electronics, computation, communications, displays, microelectromechanics, imaging, micro-actuators, nanoelectronics, optoelectronics, photovoltaics, power ICs and micro-sensors. Tutorial and review papers on these subjects are also published and occasional special issues appear to present a collection of papers which treat particular areas in more depth and breadth.

T-ED is published by the IEEE Electron Devices Society. T-ED was established in November 1952 as the Transactions of the IRE Professional Group on Electron Devices; in 1954 issues were collected as Volume ED-1 originating the current volume numbering. From January 1955 T-ED was published as the IRE Transactions on Electron Devices and was finally the current denomination in January 1963 (Volume ED-10). Monthly issues were published starting from 1964 (Volume ED-11).

The editor-in-chief is Albert Wang (University of California, Riverside). According to the Journal Citation Reports, the journal has a 2024 impact factor of 3.2.
