= Isovector =

In particle physics, isovector refers to the vector transformation of a particle under the SU(2) group of isospin. An isovector state is a triplet state with total isospin 1, with the third component of isospin either 1, 0, or -1, much like a triplet state in the two-particle addition of Spin.

== See also ==
- Isoscalar
