= International Journal of Nanoscience =

- Discipline: Nanotechnology
- Language: English
- Edited by: Massimo F. Bertino

Publication details
- History: 2002-present
- Publisher: World Scientific

Standard abbreviations
- ISO 4: Int. J. Nanosci.

Indexing
- CODEN: IJNNAJ
- ISSN: 0219-581X (print); 1793-5350 (web)
- LCCN: 2003208351

Links
- Journal homepage

The International Journal of Nanoscience is an interdisciplinary peer-reviewed scientific journal published by World Scientific. It covers research in nanometer scale science and technology, with articles ranging from the "basic science of nanoscale physics and chemistry to applications in nanodevices, quantum engineering and quantum computing".

The editor-in-chief is Massimo F. Bertino (Virginia Commonwealth University).

== Abstracting and indexing ==
This journal is indexed in the following databases:

- Chemical Abstracts Service
- CSA Aerospace Sciences Abstracts
- Compendex
- Inspec
- Scopus
