= IEEE Microwave and Wireless Components Letters =

- Discipline: Microwave theory and techniques
- Language: English
- Edited by: Roberto Gómez García

Publication details
- Former name(s): IEEE Microwave and Guided Wave Letters
- History: 1991-present
- Publisher: IEEE Microwave Theory and Techniques Society
- Frequency: Monthly
- Impact factor: 3.0 (2022)

Standard abbreviations
- ISO 4: IEEE Microw. Wirel. Compon. Lett.

Indexing
- IEEE Microwave and Wireless Components Letters
- ISSN: 1531-1309
- LCCN: 00214018
- OCLC no.: 50187335
- IEEE Microwave and Guided Wave Letters
- ISSN: 1051-8207

Links
- Journal homepage; Online access

IEEE Microwave and Wireless Components Letters is a monthly peer-reviewed scientific journal published by the IEEE Microwave Theory and Techniques Society. The editor-in-chief is Roberto Gómez García (University of Alcala). The journal covers research on electromagnetic radiation and the relevant, physical components to achieve such radiations. It focuses on devices, intermediate parts of systems, and completed systems of the interested wavelengths, but also includes papers which emphasize theory, experiment, and applications of the subjects covered.

== Abstracting and indexing ==
The journal is abstracted and indexed in Science Citation Index Expanded and Current Contents/Engineering, Computing & Technology. According to the Journal Citation Reports, the journal has a 2022 impact factor of 3.0.

== History ==
The journal was established in 1999 as IEEE Microwave and Guided Wave Letters and obtained its current title in December 2000. This former title was abstracted and indexed in Computer & Control Abstracts, Electrical & Electronics Abstracts, and Physics Abstracts.
