= IEEE Transactions on Semiconductor Manufacturing =

- Discipline: Semiconductor device fabrication
- Language: English
- Edited by: Reha Uzsoy

Publication details
- History: 1988–present
- Publisher: IEEE
- Frequency: Quarterly
- Impact factor: 2.874 (2020)

Standard abbreviations
- ISO 4: IEEE Trans. Semicond. Manuf.

Indexing
- ISSN: 0894-6507 (print); 1558-2345 (web)
- LCCN: 88659341
- OCLC no.: 16152423

Links
- Journal homepage; Online access

The IEEE Transactions on Semiconductor Manufacturing is a quarterly peer-reviewed scientific journal published by the IEEE. It covers research on semiconductor device fabrication, including simulation and modeling from the factory to the detailed process level, defect control, yield analysis and optimization, production planning and scheduling, environmental issues in semiconductor manufacturing, and manufacturability improvement. The editor-in-chief is Reha Uzsoy (North Carolina State University). According to the Journal Citation Reports, the journal has a 2020 impact factor of 2.874.

The journal is a joint publication of the IEEE Solid-State Circuits Society, IEEE Components, Packaging & Manufacturing Technology Society, IEEE Electron Devices Society, and the IEEE Reliability Society.
