= International Conference on the Physics of Semiconductors =

The International Conference on the Physics of Semiconductors (also known by the acronym ICPS) is a biennial conference series on semiconductor science. This biennial meeting is the premier forum for reporting all aspects of semiconductor physics including electronic, structural, optical, magnetic and transport properties. The conference will reflect the state of the art in semiconductor physics with a heritage dating back to the 1950s.

== Conference list ==
- ICPS 1 - Reading (1950)
- ICPS 2 - Amsterdam (1954)
- ICPS 3 - Garmisch-Partenkirchen (1956)
- ICPS 4 - Rochester (1958)
- ICPS 5 - Prague (1960)
- ICPS 6 - Exeter (1962)
- ICPS 7 - Paris (1964)
- ICPS 8 - Kyoto (1966)
- ICPS 9 - Moscow (1968)
- ICPS 10 - Cambridge (USA) (1970)
- ICPS 11 - Warsaw (1972)
- ICPS 12 - Stuttgart (1974)
- ICPS 13 - Rome (1976)
- ICPS 14 - Edinburgh (1978)
- ICPS 15 - Kyoto (1980)
- ICPS 16 - Montpellier (1982)
- ICPS 17 - San Francisco (1984)
- ICPS 18 - Stockholm (1986)
- ICPS 19 - Warsaw (1988)
- ICPS 20 - Thessaloniki (1990)
- ICPS 21 - Beijing (1992)
- ICPS 22 - Vancouver (1994)
- ICPS 23 - Berlin (1996)
- ICPS 24 - Jerusalem (1998)
- ICPS 25 - Osaka (2000)
- ICPS 26 - Edinburgh (2002)
- ICPS 27 - Flagstaff (2004)
- ICPS 28 - Vienna (2006)
- ICPS 29 - Rio de Janeiro (2008)
- ICPS 30 - Seoul (2010)
- ICPS 31 - Zurich (2012)
- ICPS 32 - Austin (2014)
- ICPS 33 - Beijing (2016)
- ICPS 34 - Montpellier (2018)
- ICPS 35 - ~~Sydney~~ (2020) postponed due to COVID-19 pandemic
- ICPS 35 - Sydney (2022)
- ICPS 36 - Ottawa (2024)
- ICPS 37 - Tokyo (2026)
